= Empty category =

Linguistics concept

In linguistics, an empty category, which may also be referred to as a covert category, is an element in the study of syntax that does not have any phonological content and is therefore unpronounced. Empty categories exist in contrast to overt categories which are pronounced. When representing empty categories in tree structures, linguists use a null symbol (∅) to depict the idea that there is a mental category at the level being represented, even if the word(s) are being left out of overt speech. The phenomenon was named and outlined by Noam Chomsky in his 1981 LGB framework, and serves to address apparent violations of locality of selection — there are different types of empty categories that each appear to account for locality violations in different environments. Empty categories are present in most of the world's languages, although different languages allow for different categories to be empty.

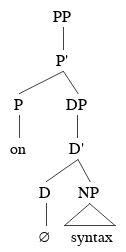
A PP small clause illustrating a null determiner.

== Null DPs ==
While the classical theory recognizes four types of null DPs (DP-trace, WH-trace, PRO, and pro), recent research has found evidence for null DPs that don't appear to fit the classical model such as the distinction of null subjects and null objects.

=== The classical theory ===
In the classical theory model, empty (or null) DPs can be broken down into four main types: DP-trace, WH-trace, PRO, and pro. Each appears in a specific environment, and is further differentiated by two binding features: the anaphoric feature [a] and the pronominal feature [p]. The four possible interactions of plus or minus values for these features yield the four types of null DPs.

[a]	[p]	Symbol	Name of null DP	Corresponding overt noun type
+	+	PRO	"big Pro"	none
-	+	pro	"little Pro"	pronoun
+	-	t	DP-trace	anaphor
-	-	t	Wh-trace	R-expression

In the table, [+a] means that the particular element must be bound within its governing category. [+p] means that the empty category is taking the place of an overt pronoun. Having a negative value for a specific feature indicates that a particular type of null DP is not subject to the requirements of the feature.

Not all empty categories enter the derivation of a sentence at the same point. Both DP-trace and WH-trace, as well as all the null heads, are only generated as the result of movement operations. "-trace" refers to the position in the sentence that holds syntactic content in the deep structure, but that has undergone movement so that it is not present at the surface structure. Conversely, both "PRO" and "pro" are not the result of movement and must be generated in the deep structure. In both the government and binding and minimalism frameworks, the only method of base-generation is lexical insertion. This means that both "PRO" and "pro" are held to be entries in the mental lexicon, whereas DP-trace and Wh-trace, and null heads are not categories in the lexicon.

==== PRO (Big Pro) ====
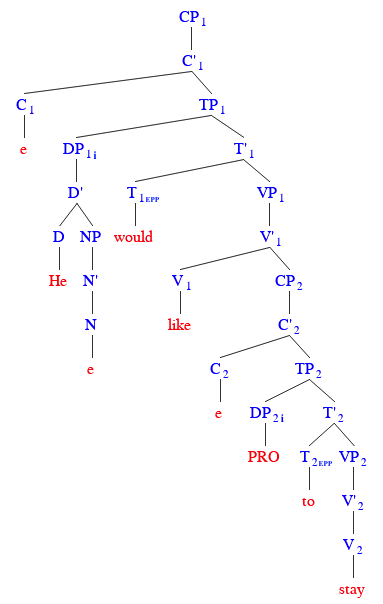
This example shows "PRO" in the subject position of the embedded clause, and co-referenced to [He].

The empty category subclass called PRO, referred to orally as "big pro", is a DP which appears in a caseless position. PRO is a universal lexical element, it is said to be able to occur in every language, in an environment with a non-finite embedded clause. However, its occurrence is limited: PRO must occupy the specifier position of the embedded, non-finite clause, such as in the example below:

This example does not use PRO, but instead, uses an overt pronoun ("you") in the specifier position of the embedded non-finite clause:

    1a) Hei would like youj to stay.

This example does use PRO, because instead of an overt pronoun, there is an empty category which is co-referenced with "He", appearing in the specifier position of the non-finite embedded clause:

    1b) Hei would like PROi to stay.

The example tree to the right is the tree structure for this sentence, [He_{i} would like PRO_{i} to stay], and shows PRO surfacing in the specifier position of the TP in the embedded clause, and co-referenced to (referring to the same being as) the subject of the matrix clause. We can interpret this as the DP subject [He] having control over PRO. In other words, the meaning of PRO is determined by the meaning of DP [He], as they are co-referenced. This is an example of a subject control construction, where the pronominal subject [He] is selected for by both the main verb [like] and the embedded infinitive verb [stay], thus forcing the introduction of an unpronounced lexical item (PRO) at the subject of the embedded clause, in order to fulfil the selectional requirements of both verbs. Alternatively, we see object control constructions when the object of the sentence controls the meaning of PRO.

However, while the meaning of PRO can be determined by its controller (here, the subject of the matrix clause), it does not have to be. PRO can either be controlled ("obligatory control") or uncontrolled ("optional control"). The realization that PRO does not behave exactly like an R-Expression, an anaphor, or a pronoun (it is in fact, simultaneously an anaphor and a pronoun) led to the conclusion that it must be a category in and of itself. It can sometimes be bound, is sometimes co-referenced in the sentence, and does not fit into binding theory.

Note that in modern theories, embedded clauses that introduce PRO as a subject are CPs.

==== pro (little pro) ====
"Little pro" occurs in a subject position of a finite clause and has case. The DP is ‘dropped’ from a sentence if its reference can be recovered from the context; "pro" is the silent counterpart of an overt pronoun. Spanish is an example of a language with rich subject-verb morphology that can allow null subjects. The agreement-marking on the verb in Spanish allows the subject to be identified even if the subject is absent from the spoken form of the sentence. This does not happen in English because the agreement-markings in English are not sufficient for a listener to be able to deduce the meaning of a missing referent.

Chinese is an example of a pro-drop language, where both subjects and objects can be dropped from the pronounced part of finite sentences, and their meaning remains clear from the context. In pro-drop languages, the covert "pro" is allowed to replace all overt pronouns, resulting in the grammaticality of sentences that do not have a subject nor object that is overtly pronounced:

This example illustrates how a Chinese question might be asked with "Zhangsan" as the subject and "Lisi" as the object:

Zhangsan kanjian Lisi le ma?
Zhangsan see Lisi ASP Q?
‘Did Zhangsan see Lisi?’

Below is an example of a response to the question above. Both subject and object are optionally pronounced categories. The meaning of the sentence can be easily recovered, even though the pronouns are dropped. (Round brackets indicate an optional element.)

(ta) kanjian (ta) le.
(He) saw (him) PRF.

The same point can be made with overt pronouns in English, as in the sentence “John said I saw him”, where the chance of picking [John] as the antecedent for [him] is clearly greater than that of picking any other person.

In example 4), the null object must be referring to the matrix clause subject [Zhangsan] but not the embedded subject [Lisi], since condition C of the Binding Theory states that it must be free. (Square brackets indicate that an element is covert (not pronounced), as in the second English translation.)

Zhangsan shuo Lisi hen xihuan.
Zhangsan say Lisi very like.
'Zhangsan said that Lisi liked [him].'

==== DP-trace (t_{DP}) ====
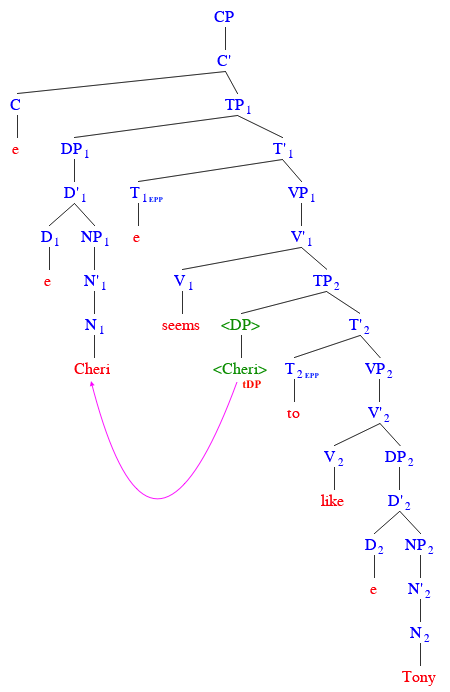
This example shows the movement of DP [Cheri] from the specifier position of the embedded infinitive clause to the specifier position of the TP in the matrix clause.

In certain syntactic environments (e.g. specifier VP and the specifier position of a TP which introduces a non-finite verb), case features are unable to be “checked”, and a determiner phrase must move throughout the phrase structure in order to check the case features. When this happens, a movement rule is initiated, and the structure is altered so that we hear the DP overtly pronounced in the position of the sentence which it has been moved to; a DP-trace is an empty category that appears at the original spot (the underlying position) of the DP, and stands for the syntactic space in the tree that the DP previously occupied. DP-trace is found in complementary distribution to PRO.

Underlying word order in the sentence "Cheri seems to like Tony."

2a) [  ] seems Cheri to like Tony.

Spoken form of the sentence "Cheri seems to like Tony."

2b) Cheri seems [  tDP ] to like Tony.

_{*Square brackets throughout example 2 indicate an empty DP category}

This English example shows that DP [Cheri] is originally introduced in the specifier position of the embedded infinitive clause, before moving to the specifier position of the matrix clause. This movement happens in order to check the features of the raising verb [seem], and leaves behind a DP-trace (tDP) in the original position of the DP. You can use the position of the DP-trace to identify where the DP is introduced in the underlying structure.

==== WH-trace (t_{WH}) ====
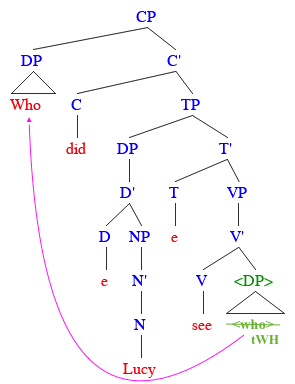
This example shows the movement of "WH" DP [who] from the complement position of the verb to the specifier position of CP.

DPs can move for another reason: in the case of Wh-questions. In English, these are questions that begin with <wh> (e.g. who/whom, what, when, where, why, which, and how); words that serve the same function in other languages do not necessarily begin with <wh>, but are still treated as “Wh-items” under this framework. The responses to these questions cannot be yes or no; they must be answered using informative phrases. Wh-items undergo Wh-movement to the specifier of CP, leaving a Wh-trace (tWH) in its original position. Just like for DP-movement, this movement is the result of feature checking, this time, to check the [+WH] feature in C.

To form a Wh-question in the example below, the DP [who] moves to the specifier of the CP position, leaving a Wh-trace in its original position. Due to the extended projection principle, there is DP movement to the specifier of TP position. There is also T to C movement, with the addition of Do-support. These additional movement operations are not shown in the given example, for simplicity.

Example 5: Underlying order of words in the sentence “Who did Lucy see?” (Square brackets throughout example 5 indicate an empty category.)

5a) [  ] did Lucy see who

Spoken form of the sentence "Who did Lucy see?"

5b) Who did Lucy see [  tWH ]?

_{*Square brackets throughout example 5 indicate an empty category.}

_{*You can see where "Who" was in the initial word order by where the WH-Trace appears in the spoken form.}

The tree to the right illustrates this example of WH-trace. Initially, the sentence is "[CP] did Lucy see who,” which has an empty specifier position of CP, as indicated by square brackets. After the Wh-item [who] is relocated to the specifier position of CP, the empty position is left at the end, in the original position of [who]. What is left in its place is the WH-trace.

A special relationship holds between the WH-item and the complementizer of a sentence:

 6a) [DP The person [CP who ØC [TPlikes Max]]] is here.
 6b) [DP The person [CP tWH that [TPlikes Max]]] is here.
 6c) * [DP The person [CP tWH ØC [TPlikes Max]]] is here.

In this example, the complementizer or the WH-item can have null categories, and one or the other may show up as null. However, they cannot both be null when the WH-item is the subject.

An important note to remember is that DP-trace and WH-trace are the result of movement operations, while "pro" and "PRO" must be base generated.

=== Null subjects ===
Null-subject languages, such as Chinese and Italian, allow the omission of an explicit subject in an independent clause by replacing it with a null subject. This is unlike languages like English or French which require an explicit subject in this sentence. This phenomenon is similar, but not identical, to that of pro-drop languages, which may omit subject, object or both pronouns. While all pro-drop languages are null-subject languages, not all null-subject languages are pro-drop.

For example, in Italian the subject "she" can be either explicit or implicit:

Maria non vuole mangiare.
Maria not wants [to-]eat
"Maria does not want to eat."

{} Non vuole mangiare.
Subject not wants [to-]eat
"[(S)he] does not want to eat."

=== Null object constructions ===
Many languages such as Portuguese freely allow for the omission of the object of a transitive verb and use a variable empty category in its place. Unlike pro (little pro), variable empty objects are R-expressions and must respect Principle C of Binding Theory.

The following is an example of a null variable object construction in Portuguese:

a Joana viu ∅ na TV ontem.
the Joana saw him/her/it {on the} TV‍ yesterday
'Joana saw him/her/it on TV yesterday.'

== Null heads ==
Not only can phrasal constituents such as DPs be empty, heads may be empty as well; this includes both lexical categories and functional categories. All null heads are the result of some movement operation on the underlying structure, forcing a lexical item out of its original position, and leaving an empty category behind.

=== Null functional heads ===
There are many types of null functional categories, including determiners, complementizers and tense markers, which are the result of more recent research in the field of linguistics. Null heads are positions which end up being unpronounced at the surface level but are not included in the anaphoric and pronominal features chart that accounts for other types of empty categories.

==== Null D ====
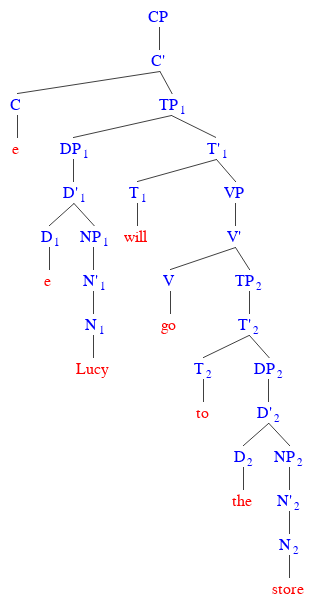
This example illustrates the existence of a null determiner within DP1, where the proper noun "Lucy" does not allow a determiner to be attached to it.

Null determiners are used mainly when the Theta assignment of a verb only allows an option for a DP as a phrase category in the sentence (with no option for a D head). Proper nouns and pronouns cannot grammatically have a determiner attached to them, though they still are part of the DP phrase. In this case, one needs to include a null category to stand as the D of the phrase as its head. Since a DP phrase has a determiner as its head, but one can end up with NPs that are not preceded by an overt determiner, a null symbol is used to represent the null determiner at the beginning of the DP.

Examples of nouns that do not need a determiner:

[DP DØ [NP Lucy]]

[DP DØ [NP she]]

[DP DØ [NP cats]]

The null determiners are subdivided into the same classes as overt determiners are, since the different null determiners are thought to appear in different grammatical contexts:

Ø_{[+PROPER]}

NP[+PROPER,-PRONOUN]

Ø_{[,+PRONOUN]}

NP[-PLURAL, -PROPER, +PRONOUN]

Ø_{[+PLURAL]}

NP[+PLURAL, -PROPER, -PRONOUN]

==== Null C ====
Cross-linguistically, complementizer-less environments (phrases which lack an overt C element) are often attested. In many cases, the complementizer is optional. In the following example, in (a), the complement clause "the cat is cute" is introduced by the overt complementizer "that". In (b), C is null; this is represented by the null symbol "Ø".

9a) She thinks that the cat is cute.
 b) She thinks  Ø   the cat is cute.

The existence of null complementizers has led to theories that attempt to account for complementizer-less environments: the CP Hypothesis and the IP Hypothesis.

===== CP Hypothesis =====
The CP Hypothesis states that finite subordinate clauses that lack an overt C at the surface level contain a CP layer that projects an empty (or unpronounced) C head.

Some evidence for this claim arises from cross-linguistic analyses of yes/no question formation, where the phenomenon of subject-auxiliary inversion (utilized in English) appears in complementary distribution with an overt complementizer question marker (for example, in Irish). Such work suggests that these are not two distinct mechanisms for yes/no question formation, but instead, that a subject-auxiliary inversion construction simply contains a special type of silent question marked complementizer. This claim is further supported by the fact that English does exhibit one environment — namely, embedded questions — that utilizes the overt question marked C “if”, and that these phrases do not employ subject-auxiliary inversion.

In addition to this, some compelling data from the Kansai dialect of Japanese, in which the same adverb can evoke different meaning depending on where it is attached in a clause, also points towards the existence of a null C. For example, in both complementizer-less and complementizer environments, the adverbial particle dake (“only”) evokes the same phrasal meaning:

John-wa [Mary-ga okot-ta tte-dake] yuu-ta.
John-TOP Mary-NOM get.angry-PAST that-only say-PAST
‘John said only that Mary got angry.'

John-wa [Mary-ga okot-ta dake] yuu-ta.
John-TOP Mary-NOM get.angry-PAST only say-PAST
'John said only Mary got angry.'

The interpretation of both (a) and (b) is as follows: “among a number of things that John might have said, John said only that Mary got angry”

John-wa [Mary-ga okot-ta-dake tte] yuu-ta.
John-TOP Mary-NOM get.angry-PAST-only that say-PAST
'John said that it is only the case that Mary got angry.'

The interpretation of (c) is as follows: “John said that among a number of people that might have gotten angry, only Mary did.”

As demonstrated by (c), the adverb should evoke a different meaning than in (a) if it is attached to any item other than a complementizer. Because (a) and (b) yield the same interpretation, this suggests that the adverbial particle must be attached at the same spot in both clauses. In (a), the adverb "dake" is clearly attached to a complementizer; so even in the complementizer-less environment (b), the adverb "dake" must still attach to a complementizer, thus pointing to the existence of a null complementizer in this phrase.

===== IP Hypothesis =====
The IP Hypothesis, on the other hand, asserts that the complementizer layer is simply nonexistent in complementizerless clauses.

Literature arguing for this hypothesis is based upon the fact that there are some syntactic environments under which a null C head would violate the rules of government under the Empty Category Principle, and thus should be disallowed.

Other work focuses on some differences in grammatical adjunction possibilities to “that” versus “that-less” clauses in English, for which the CP Hypothesis apparently cannot account. It states that under the CP Hypothesis, both clauses are CPs and thus should display the same adjunction possibilities; this is not what we find in the data. Instead, disparities in grammaticality emerge in environments of topicalization and adverbial adjunction. The IP Hypothesis is said to make up for the shortcomings of the CP hypothesis in these domains.

In Icelandic, for example, the verb "vonast til" selects for an infinitival complement:

Strákarnir vonast til að PRO verða aðstoðaðir.
boy.PL.M.DEF hope.PL.3 for to {} become assisted.PRET.PTCP.PL.M
'The boys hoped that somebody would help them.'

While in Latvian, the equivalent verb "cerēt" takes an overt complementizer phrase:

Zēni cer, ka viņiem kāds palīdzēs.
boy.PL hope.3 that they.DAT.PL someone help.FUT.3
'The boys hope that somebody will help them.'

However, while both hypothesis possess some strong arguments, they also both have some crucial shortcomings. Further research is needed in order to concretely establish a more widely agreed-upon theory.

==== Null T ====
Tense markers are used to put events in time on a timeline in relation to a reference point, usually the moment of speech. A null tense marker is when this indication of time undergoes a movement operation in the underlying structure and leaves an empty category behind. In rare cases, a null tense marker can also be the byproduct of a coordination operation, such as in Korean. For the case of Korean, some researchers suggest that in two adjacent conjuncts, the first will have a null tense morpheme. For a proper tense interpretation of the first conjunct conjunct, it is necessary to construct a phonetically null tense inflection as schown schematically in the template below:

 12) [TPSubject … V - øtense]-ko [TPSubject … V - øtense]

=== Null V ===
==== Ditransitive verbs ====
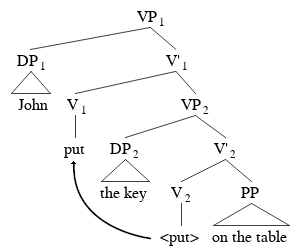
Verbs that select for three arguments cause an issue for X-bar theory, where ternary branching trees are not allowed. In order to overcome this, a second VP, called a "VP shell," is introduced in order to make room for the third argument. As a consequence, a null V is created:

The verb "put" moves to the higher V in order to assign case to the second argument, "the key."

==== Null causative verb ====
Consider the following sentences:

13a) The towel was wet.
b) They will wet the towel.
c) This will wet the towels.

The selectional properties - "the towel" always being considered the subject of "wet" - suggest the presence of a silent V contributing a causative meaning. In other words, the head is responsible for the object's theta-role.

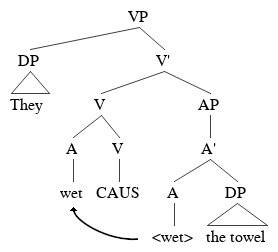

== Other possible applications ==
=== Language acquisition ===
One of the main questions that arises in linguistics when examining grammatical concepts is how children learn them. For empty categories, this is a particularly interesting consideration, since, when children ask for a certain object, their guardians usually respond in “motherese”. An example of a motherese utterance which doesn't use empty categories is in response to a child's request for a certain object. A parent might respond “You want what?” instead of “What do you want?”. In this sentence, the wh-word doesn't move, and so in the sentence that the child hears, there is no wh-trace. Possible explanations for the eventual acquisition of the notion of empty categories are that the child then learns that even when he or she doesn't hear a word in the original position, they assume one is still there, because they are used to hearing a word.

At the beginning of acquisition, children do not have a concrete concept of an empty category; it is simply a weaker version of the concept. It is noted that ‘thematic government’ may be all the child possesses at a young age and this is enough to recognize the concept of empty category. The proper amount of time must be given to learn the certain aspects of an empty category (case marking, monotonicity properties, etc.).

== See also ==
- Wh-movement
- Binding theory
- Government and Binding theory
- Trace
- Syntax
- Empty Category Principle
- Language acquisition
