= Specified subject condition =

Proposal in transformational grammar

The Specified Subject Condition (SSC) is a condition proposed in Chomsky (1973) which restricts the application of certain syntactic transformational grammar rules. In many ways it is a counterpart to the Tensed-S Condition (TSC) (proposed in the same paper), applying to non-finite clauses and complex determiner phrases (DPs) which are not covered by the TSC. The rule was formalized as follows, where a "specified subject" is a lexical subject i.e. a subject with semantic content, like a proper noun, a complex DP, or a pronominal:

Specified Subject Condition (SSC) “No rule can involve X, Y in the structure ... X ... [α... Z ... - WYV ...] ... where Z is the specified subject of WYV in α.” (Chomsky 1973: 239)

The SSC (along with the TSC) therefore had implications for the field which later became known as binding theory. In conjunction with a simple rule of disjoint reference (which stipulated that any pronoun following a noun phrase (NP) antecedent in the same sentence has disjoint reference with it, the rule applying anywhere unless it is blocked), co-reference is acceptable in the following sentences, because the SSC blocks application of this disjoint reference rule:

(1) The footballers_{i} want [the fans to love them_{i}]
(2) The footballers_{i} laughed at [the fan’s pictures of them_{i}]

The TSC (which essentially blocks transformational and binding rules from applying across clause boundaries) would not block disjoint reference in (1) and (2), hence the need for the SSC. Replacing the pronouns in (1) and (2) with reciprocals shows how the SSC blocks the application of each movement, hence the impossibility of the reciprocals referring back to "The footballers" in (3) and (4):

(3) * The footballers_{i} believe [the supermodel to love each other_{i}]
(4) * The footballers_{i} laughed at [the supermodel’s pictures of each other_{i}]

Notice that when the DP-internal subject is removed, each movement is not blocked from applying:

(5) The footballers_{i} laughed at the pictures of each other_{i}

An empirical problem for the SSC is the failure of disjoint reference to apply in a sentence like (6), where there is no specified subject blocking its application:

(6) The footballers_{i} laughed at the pictures of them_{i}

The SSC also made correct predictions for certain binding data with respect to control verbs. The notion of "specified subject" needs to be nuanced to include PRO with respect to an antecedent which does not control it; however, PRO is not a specified subject with respect to an antecedent which does control it. In the case of an object control verb like "persuade" therefore, we predict the following pattern:

(7) *We_{j} persuaded Bill_{i} [PRO_{i} to kill each other_{j}]
(8) Bill_{j} persuaded us_{i} [PRO_{i} to kill each other_{i}]
(9) We_{j} persuaded Bill_{i} [PRO_{i} to kill us_{j}]
(10) *Bill_{j} persuaded them_{i} [PRO_{i} to kill them_{i}]

In (7) PRO is a specified subject with respect to "we" (as it is controlled by "Bill" not by "we"); the SSC therefore applies to this sentence and each movement from "we" to "other" is blocked. Similarly, in (9), PRO is a specified subject for "we", thus blocking disjoint reference, so that "we" can corefer with "us" in the non-finite clause. In (8), PRO is not a specified subject for "us", allowing each movement from "us" to "other"; similarly in (10), disjoint reference between "us" in the matrix clause and "us" in the non-finite clause is not blocked by a specified subject, because "us" in the matrix clause controls PRO.

Similar examples hold for subject control verbs like "persuade": *They_{i} promised Bill_{j} [PRO_{i} to kill them_{i}] vs Bill_{j} promised them_{i} [PRO_{j} to kill them_{i}], and subject raising verbs like "seem": *They_{i} seem to Bill_{j} [t_{i} to like them_{i}] (where the trace is not specified with respect to "we" thus disjoint reference applies) vs We_{i} seem to Bill_{j} [t_{i} to like him_{j}] (where the trace is specified with respect to "Bill" so that disjoint reference is blocked).

The way the SSC accounted for binding as well as movement phenomena (such as the each movement examples above), was influential for much subsequent research which tried to reduce binding and movement to the same set of principles (see Kayne (2002) for a recent implementation). The subsequent binding conditions A and B of Chomsky (1981) essentially replaced the SSC (along with the TSC), and it is no longer a part of the toolkit of current researchers.
