= Small clause =

Concept in linguistics

In linguistics, a small clause consists of a subject and its predicate, but lacks an overt expression of tense. Small clauses have the semantic subject-predicate characteristics of a clause, and have some, but not all, properties of a syntactic constituent. Structural analyses of small clauses vary according to whether a flat or layered analysis is pursued. The small clause is also related to the phenomena of raising-to-object, exceptional case-marking, accusativus cum infinitivo, and object control.

== History ==
The two main analyses of small clauses were proposed by Edwin Williams (1975, 1980) and Tim Stowell (1981). Williams' analysis follows the Theory of Predication, where the "subject" is the "external argument of a maximal projection". In contrast, Stowell's theory follows the Theory of Small Clauses, supported by linguists such as Chomsky, Aarts, and Kitagawa. This theory uses X-bar theory to treat small clauses as constituents. Linguists debate which analysis to pursue, as there is evidence for both approaches.

=== Williams (1975, 1980) ===
The term "small clause" was coined by Edwin Williams in 1975, who specifically looked at "reduced relatives, adverbial modifier phrases, and gerundive phrases". The following three examples are treated in Williams' 1975 paper as "small clauses", as cited in Balazs 2012. However, not all linguists consider these to be small clauses according to the term's modern definition.

1. The man [ driving the bus ] is Norton's best friend.
2. John decided to leave, [ thinking the party was over ].
3. [ John’s evading his taxes ] infuriates me.

The modern definition of a small clause is an [NP XP] in a predicative relationship. This definition was proposed by Edwin Williams in 1980, who introduced the concept of Predication. He proposed that the subject NP and the predicate XP are related via co-indexation, which is made possible by c-command. In Williams' analysis, the [NP XP] of a small clause does not form a constituent.

=== Stowell (1981) ===
Timothy Stowell in 1981 analyzed the small clause as a constituent, and proposed a structure using X-bar theory. Stowell proposes that the subject is defined as an NP occurring in a specifier position, that case is assigned in the specifier position, and that not all categories have subjects. His analysis explains why case-marked subjects cannot occur in infinitival clauses, although NPs can be projected up to an infinitival clause's specifier position. Stowell considers the following examples to be small clauses and constituents.

4. I consider [ John very stupid ]
5. I expect [ that sailor off my ship ]
6. We feared [ John killed by the enemy ]
7. I saw [ John come to the kitchen ]

== Contexts ==
What does and does not qualify as a small clause varies in the literature: the example sentences in (8) contain (what some theories of syntax judge to be) small clauses. In each example, the posited small clause is in boldface, and the underlined expression functions as a predicate over the nominal immediately to its left, which is the subject. The verbs that license small clauses are a heterogeneous set, and fall into five classes:

- raising-to-object or ECM verbs like consider and want in (8a); these were the focus of early discussions of small clauses
- verbs like call and name, which subcategorize for an object NP and a predicative expression; see (8b)
- verbs like wipe and pound, which allow the appearance of a resultative predicate; see (8c)
- perception verbs like see and hear which allow the appearance of a bare infinitive; see (8d)
- verbs like believe and judge which allow the appearance of infinitival to; see (8e)

8.	contexts for small clauses in English	
a.	(i)	Susan considers [ **Sam a dope** ].
	(ii)	We want [ **you sober** ].
b.	(i)	Jim called [ **me a liar** ].
	(ii)	They named [ **him Pedro** ].
c.	(i)	Fred wiped [ **the table clean** ].
	(ii)	Larry pounded [ **the nail flat** ].
d.	(i)	We saw [ **Fred leave** ].
	(ii)	Did you hear [ **them arrive** ]?
e.	(i)	Larry believes [ **that to be folly** ].
	(ii)	Do you judge [ **it to be possible** ]?

A trait that the examples in (8a-b-c) have in common is that the small clause lacks a verb. Indeed, this is sometimes taken as a defining aspect of small clauses, i.e. to qualify as a small clause, a verb must be absent. If, however, one allows a small clause to contain a verb, then the sentences in (8d-e) can also be treated as containing small clauses: The similarity across the sentences (8a-b-c) and (8d-e) is obvious, since the same subject-predicate relationship is present in all these sentences. Hence if one treats sentences (8a-b-c) as containing small clauses, one can also treat sentences (50e-f) as containing small clauses. A defining characteristic of all five contexts for English small clauses in (8a-b-c-d-e) is that the tense associated with finite clauses, which contain a finite verb, is absent.

== Structural analyses ==
Broadly speaking, there are three competing analyses of the structure of small clauses.

- the flat structure analysis treats the subject and predicate of the small clause as sister constituents
- the layered structure analysis treats the subject and predicate as a single "small clause" (SC) constituent
- the X-bar theory analysis treats the subject and predicate as a single constituent projected from the head of the small clause, which may be V, N, A, or P (with some analyses having additional functional structure)

=== Flat structure ===
The flat structure organizes small clause material into two distinct sister constituents.

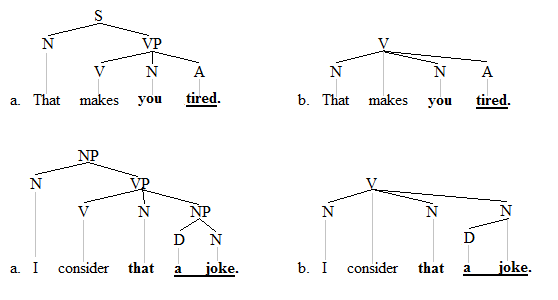

The a-trees on the left are the phrase structure trees, and the b-trees on the right are the dependency trees. The key aspect of these structures is that the small clause material consists of two separate sister constituents.

The flat analysis is preferred by those working in dependency grammars and representational phrase structure grammars (e.g. Generalized Phrase Structure Grammar and Head-Driven Phrase Structure Grammar).

=== Layered structure ===
The layered structure organizes small clause material into one constituent. The phrase structure trees are again on the left, and the dependency trees on the right. To mark the small clause in the phrase structure trees, the node label SC is used.

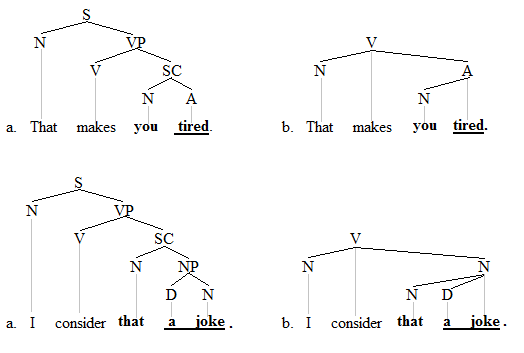

The layered analysis is preferred by those working in the Government and Binding framework and its tradition, for examples see Chomsky, Ouhalla, Culicover, Haegeman and Guéron.

=== X-Bar Theory structures ===
See X-Bar Theory for a general exploration of X-Bar Theory.

X-bar theory predicts that a head (X) will project into an intermediate constituent (X') and a maximal projection (XP). There were three common analyses of the internal structure of a small clause under X-Bar theory. Here they are each presented as showing the NP AP small clause complement in the sentence (highlighted in bold), "I consider _{(NP)}Mary _{(AP)}smart":

==== Analysis 1: symmetric constituent ====
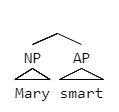
Adapted from Citko 2011

In this analysis, neither of the constituents determine the category, meaning that it is an exocentric construction. Some linguists believe that the label of this structure can be symmetrically determined by the constituents, and others believe that this structure lacks a label altogether. In order to indicate a predicative relationship between the subject (in this case, the NP Mary), and the predicate (AP smart), some have suggested a system of co-indexation, where the subject must c-command any predicate associated with it.

This analysis is not compatible with X-bar theory because X-bar theory does not allow for headless constituents, additionally this structure may not be an accurate representation of a small clause because it lacks an intermediate functional element that connects the subject with the predicate. Evidence of this element can be seen as an overt realization in a variety of languages such as Welsh, Norwegian, and English, as in the examples below (with the overt predicative functional category highlighted in bold):

9. I regard Fred **as** insane.
10. I consider Fred **as** my best friend.

Some have taken this as evidence that this structure does not adequately portray the structure of a small clause, and that a better structure must include some intermediate projection that combines the subject and the predicate which would assign a head to the constituent.

==== Analysis 2: projection of the predicate ====
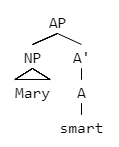
Adapted from Citko 2011

In this analysis, the small clause can be identified as a projection of the predicate (in this example, the predicate would be the 'smart' in 'Mary smart'). In this view, the specifier of the structure (in this case, the NP 'Mary') is the subject of the head (in this case, the A 'smart'). This analysis builds on Chomsky's model of phrase structure and is proposed by Stowell and Contreras.

==== Analysis 3: projection of a functional category ====
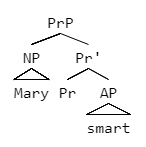
Adapted from Citko 2011

The PrP (predicate phrase) category (also analyzed as AgrP, PredP, and $\pi$P), was proposed for a few reasons, some of which are outlined below:

- This structure helps to account for coordination where the categories of the items being coordinated must be the same. This accounts for the mystery of phrases such as (11) below, where a predicative adjective phrase (AP) is coordinated with a predicative noun phrase (NP), and this coordination of unlike categories is grammatical. The PrP analysis solves this problem by treating the constituents being coordinated as intermediate projection of the Pr head, namely Pr', as in (12).
  11. Mayor Shinn considered **Eulalie** [_{AP} **talented** ] and [_{NP} **a tyrant** ]
  12. Mayor Shinn considered [_{PrP} **Eulalie** [_{Pr'} (P) [_{AP} **talented** ]] and [_{Pr'} (P) [_{NP} **a tyrant** ]]
- This structure answers the question of the category of the word as in small clause constructions such as I regard **Fred as my best friend**. This structure was an issue if as is analyzed as a preposition, as prepositions do not take adjective phrase complements. However, analyzing as as the overt realization of the Pr head is consistent with X-bar theory.

Additionally, some have theorized that a combination of the three structures can illustrate why the subjects of verbal small clauses and adjectival small clauses seem to behave differently, as noted by Basilico:

13. The prisoner seems/appears **to be intelligent**.
14. The prisoner seems/appears **intelligent**.
15. The prisoner seems/appears **to leave every day at noon**.
16. *The prisoner seems/appears **leave every day at noon**.

Here, examples (13) and (14) show that the subject of an adjectival small clause — with our without copular be — can raise to the matrix subject position. However, with a verbal clause, omission of infinitival to leads to ungrammatically, as shown by the contrast between the well-formed (15) and the ill-formed (16), where the asterisk (*) marks ungrammaticality. From this evidence, some linguists have theorized that the subjects of adjectival and verbal small clauses must differ in syntactic position. This conclusion is bolstered by the knowledge that verbal and adjectival small clauses differ in their predication forms. While adjectival small clauses involve categorical predication where the predicate ascribes a property to the subject, verbal small clauses involve thetic predications where an event that the subject is participating in is reported. Basilico uses this to argue that a small clause should be analyzed as a Topic Phrase, which is projected from the predicate head (the Topic), with the subject introduced as the specifier of the Topic Phrase. In this way, he argues that in an adjectival small clause, the predicate is formed for an individual topic, and in a verbal small clause the events form a predicate of events for a stage topic, which accounts for why verbal small clauses cannot be raised to the matrix subject position.

== Identification tests ==
A small clause divides into two constituents: the subject and its predicate. While small clauses occur cross-linguistically, different languages have different restrictions on what can and cannot be a well-formed (i.e., grammatical) small clause. Criteria for identifying a small clause include:

- absence of tense-marking on the predicate
- possibility of negating the small clause predicate
- selectional restrictions imposed by the matrix verb that introduces the small clause
- constituency tests (coordination of small clauses, small clause in subject position, movement of small clause)

=== Absence of tense-marking ===
A small clause is characterised as having two constituents NP and XP that enter into a predicative relation, but lacking finite tense and/or a verb. Possible predicates in small clauses typically include adjective phrases (AP), prepositional phrases (PPs), noun phrases (NPs), or determiner phrases (DPs) (see determiner phrase page on debate regarding the existence of DPs).

There are two schools of thought regarding NP VP constructions. Some linguists believe that a small clause characteristically lacks a verb, while others believe that a small clause may have a verb but lacks inflected tense. The following examples, which all lack verbs, illustrate small clauses with [NP AP] (17), [NP DP] (18), and [NP PP] (19):

17. I consider [ **Mary smart** ]
18. I consider [ **Mary my best friend** ]
19. I consider [ **Mary out of her mind** ]

The small clause examples in (17) to (19) contrast with the examples in (20) to (22), with the critical difference being the inclusion of the copular verb be preceded by infinitival to:

20. I consider [ **Mary** to be **smart** ]
21. I consider [ **Mary** to be **my best friend** ]
22. I consider [ **Mary** to be **out of her mind** ]

In some analyses the presence of the copular verb and tense (infinitival to) makes the bolded portions a full clause rather than a small clause. However, other analyses treat infinitival clauses as a kind of small clause. The latter approach proposes that small clauses lack inflected tense but can have a bare infinitival verb. Under this theory, NP VP constructions are allowed. The following examples contrast small clauses with non-finite verbs with main clauses with finite verbs.

23. They think that they are **ready to leave**.
24. *They think that they are **ready left**.
25. They think that they must leave.

The asterisk here represents that the sentence (24) is generally held to be ungrammatical by native English speakers.

=== Selectional restrictions ===
==== Selected by matrix verb ====
Small clauses satisfy selectional requirements of the verb in the main clause in order to be grammatical.

The argument structure of verbs is satisfied with small clause constructions. The following two examples show how the argument structure of the verb "consider" affects what predicate can be in the small clause.

26. I consider [ **Mr. Nyman a genius** ].
27. *I consider [ **Mr. Nyman in my shed** ].

Example (18) is ungrammatical as the verb "consider" does take an NP complement, but not a PP complement.

However, this theory of selectional requirement is also disputed, as substitution of different small clauses can create grammatical readings. Both examples (28) and (29) take PP complements, yet (28) is grammatical but (29) is not.

28. I consider [ **the team in no fit state to play** ].
29. *I consider [ **my friends on the roof** ].

The matrix verb's selection of case also supports the theory that the matrix verb's selectional requirements affect small clause licensing. The verb consider in (30) marks accusative case on the subject NP of the small clause. This conclusion is supported by pronoun-substitution, where the accusative caseform is grammatical (31), but the nominative case form is not (32).

30. I consider [ **Natasha a visionary** ].
31. I consider [ **her a visionary** ].
32. *I consider [ **she a visionary** ].

In Serbo-Croatian, the verb smatrati 'to consider' selects for accusative case for its subject argument and instrumental case as its complement argument.

(33)	(Ja)	smatram	**ga**	**budalom**.
	I-NOM	consider	him-ACC	a fool-INSTR
	'I consider **him a fool**.'			

(34) *	(Ja)	smatram	**ga**	***budala**.
	I-NOM	consider	him-ACC	*a fool-ACC.
	['I consider **him a fool**.']			

==== Semantically determined ====
Small clauses' grammaticality judgments are affected by their semantic value.

The following examples show how semantic selection also affects predication of a small clause.

35. *The doctor considers [ **that patient dead tomorrow** ].
36. Our pilot considers [ **that island off our route** ].

Some small clauses that appear to be ungrammatical can be well-formed given the appropriate context. This suggests that the semantic relation of the main verb and the small clause affects sentences' grammaticality.

37. *I consider [ **John off my ship** ].
38. As soon as he sets foot on the gangplank, I'll consider [ **John off my ship** ].

==== Negation ====
Small clauses may not be negated by a negative modal or auxiliary verb, such as don't, shan't, or can't. Small clauses may only be negated by negative particles, such as not.

39. I consider [ **Rome** not **a good choice** ].
40. *I consider [ **Rome** might not **a good choice** ].

=== Constituency ===
There are a number of considerations that support or refute the one or the other analysis. The layered analysis, which, again, views the small clause as a constituent, is supported by the basic insight that the small clause functions as a single semantic unit, i.e. as a clause consisting of a subject and a predicate.

==== Coordination ====
Only constituents of a like type can be joined via coordination. Small clauses can be coordinated, which suggests they are constituents of a like type, but see coordination (linguistics) on the controversy regarding the effectiveness and accuracy of coordination as a constituency test. The following examples illustrate small clause coordination for [NP AP] (32), and [NP NP/DP] (33) small clauses.

41. He considers [ **Maria wise** ] and [ **Jane talented** ].
42. She considers [ **John a tyrant** ] and [ **Martin a clown** ].

==== Subjecthood ====
The layered analysis is also supported by the fact that in certain cases, a small clause can function as the subject of the greater clause, e.g.

43. [ **Bill behind the wheel** ] is a scary thought. - Small clause functioning as subject
44. [ **Sam drunk** ] is something everyone wants to avoid. - Small clause functioning as subject

Most theories of syntax judge subjects to be single constituents, hence the small clauses Bill behind the wheel and Sam drunk here should each be construed as one constituent. Concerning small clauses in subject position, see Culicover, Haegeman and Guéron.

==== Complement of with ====
Further, small clauses can appear as the complement of with, e.g.:

45. With [ **Bill behind the wheel** ], we're in trouble. _{- Small clause as complement of with}
46. With [ **Sam drunk** ], we've got a big problem. _{- Small clause as complement of with}

These data are also easier to accommodate if the small clause is a constituent.

==== Movement ====
One could argue, however, that small clauses in subject position and as the complement of with are fundamentally different from small clauses in object position. Some datapoints have the small clause following the matrix verb, whereby the subject of the small clause is also the object of the matrix clause. In such cases, the matrix verb appears to be subcategorizing for its object noun (phrase), which then functions as the subject of the small clause. In this regard, there are a number of observations suggesting that the object/subject noun phrase is a direct dependent of the matrix verb. If so, then this means the flat structure is the correct analysis. This captures that fact, with such object/subject noun phrases, as illustrated in (47), the small clause generally does not behave as a single constituent with respect to movement diagnostics. Thus, the "subject" of a small clause cannot participate in topicalization (47b), clefting (47c), pseudo-cleating (47d), nor can it served as an answer fragment (47e). Moreover, like ordinary object NPs, the "subject" of a small clause can becomes the subject of the corresponding passive sentence (47f), and can be realized as a reflexive pronoun that is coindexed with the matrix subject (47g).

47. Application of movement diagnostics to [NP AP] small clause
a.	She proved **him guilty**.	
b.	***Him guilty** she proved.	Small clause fails topicalization diagnostic for identifying constituents.
c.	*It is **him guilty** that she proved.	Small clause fails clefting diagnostic for identifying constituents.
d.	*What she proved was **him guilty**.	Small clause fails pseudoclefting diagnostic for identifying constituents.
e.	*What did she prove? - ??**Him guilty**.	Small clause fails the answer fragment diagnostic for identifying constituents
f.	**He** was proved **guilty**.	Subject of small clause becomes the subject of matrix clause in the corresponding passive sentence.
g.	She_{1} proved **herself_{1} guilty**.	Reflexive pronoun takes the matrix subject as its antecedent.

The datapoints in (47b-g) are consistent with the flat analysis of small clauses: in such an analysis the object of the matrix clause plays a dual role insofar as it is also the subject of the embedded predicate.

==== Counter-Arguments ====
Small clauses' constituency status is not agreed upon by linguists. Some linguists argue that small clauses do not form a constituent, but rather form a noun phrase.

One argument is that [NP AP small] clauses cannot occur in the subject position without modification, as shown by the ungrammatically of (48). However, these [NP AP] small clauses can occur after the verb if they are modified, such as in example (49).

48. *[ **Lots of books dirty** ] is a common problem in libraries.
49. [ **Lots of books dirty from mistreatment** ] is a common problem in libraries.

A second argument is coordination tests make incorrect predictions about constituency, particularly regarding small clauses. This casts doubt upon the status of small clauses as constituents.

50. Louis gave [a book to Marie yesterday] and [a painting to Barbara the day before].

Another counterexample of constituency looks at depictive secondary predicates.

51. They sponged [ **the water up** ].

One school of thought argues that this example has [the water up] behaving as a constituent small clause, while another school of thought argues that the verb "sponge" does not select for a small clause, and that the water up semantically, but not syntactically, shows the resultative state of the verb.

== Cross-linguistic variation ==
=== Raising-to-object ===
Complement small clauses are related to the phenomena of raising-to-object, therefore this theory will be discussed in more detail for English and Korean.

==== English ====
Raising-to-object with a direct object is illustrated in (52) with the verb proved. The bolded constituents represent the small clause of the sentence. By hypothesis, the raising-to-object analysis treats the subject of the small clause as having raised from the embedded small clause to the main clause

52.
a.	The DA proved [ **two men guilty** ] during each other’s trials
b.	The DA proved [ **no suspect guilty** ] during his trial
c.	The DA proved [ **no one guilty** ] during any of the trials

Raising (linguistics) is obligatory in small clauses for the make out construction. This is evident by the grammaticality of (i) and ungrammaticality of (ii) without raising-to-object behaviour as demonstrated in the table below:

53.
a.	They're trying to make **John out a liar**
b.	*?They're trying to make **out John a liar**

The range of scope can also implicate the subject of Raising in small clauses. Semantically, wide scope entails a general situation, for example, where everyone has some person that they love, whereas narrow scope entails a specific situation, for example, where everyone love the same person. Considering only verbless small clauses, small clauses are only accessibly with the wide range of scope with respect to the main verb.

54.
a.	I believe **someone guilty**
b.	John proved **two assumptions false**

==== Korean ====
In Korean, raising-to-object is optional from with complement clauses, but obligatory with complement small clauses. A fully inflected complement clause is given in (55), and the object Mary can be marked either with nominative case (55a) or with accusative case (55b). In contrast, with a complement small clause as in (56), the subject of the small clause can only be marked with accusative; thus while (56a) is ill-formed, (56b) is well-formed.

55. Korean complement clause: optional raising-to-object
a.	존	은	매리	가	미덥	-다-	-고	생각한다
	John	un	Mary	ga	mitep	-ta-	-ko	sangkakhanda
	John	NOM	Mary	NOM	reliable	DEC	COMP	think.PRES.DECL
b.	존	은	매리	를	미덥	-다-	-고	생각한다
	John	un	Mary	lul	mitep	-ta-	-ko	sangkakhanda
	John	NOM	Mary	ACC	reliable	DEC	COMP	think.PRES.DECL
	'John thinks that Mary is reliable.'							

56. Korean complement small clause: obligatory raising-to-object
a.	존	은	매리	***가**	미덥	-게	생각한다
	John	un	Mary	***ga**	mitep	-gye	sangkakhanda
	John	NOM	Mary	***NOM**	reliable	SC	think.PRES.DECL
b.	존	은	매리	**를**	미덥	-게	생각한다
	John	un	Mary	**lul**	mitep	-gye	sangkakhanda
	John	NOM	Mary	**ACC**	reliable	SC	think.PRES.DECL
	'John thinks **Mary reliable**.'						

=== Categorical restrictions ===
==== French (Romance) ====
At first glance, French small clauses appear to be unrestricted relative to which category can realize a small clause. Illustrative examples are given below: there are [NP AP] small clauses (57); [NP PP] small clauses (58), as well as [NP VP] small clauses (59).

57.	Louis	considère	[_{NP} **Marie** ]	[_{AP} **drôle** ].
	Louis	considers	Marie	funny
	'Louis considers **Marie funny**.'			

58.	Marie	voulait	[_{NP} **Louis** ]	[_{PP} **dans son bureau** ].
	Marie	want+past	Louis	in her office
	'Marie wanted **Louis in her office**.'			

59.	Louis	voyait	[_{NP} **Marie** ]	[_{VP} **jouer de la cornemuse** ].
	Louis	see+past	Marie	play+inf. of the bagpipe
	'Louis saw **Marie play the bagpipe**.'			

However, there are some restrictions on NP VP constructions. The verb in example (59) is infinitival, without inflected tense, and takes a PP complement. However, the following example (d) is an NP VP small clause construction that is ungrammatical. Although the verb here is infinitival, it cannot grammatically take an AP complement.

(d)	*I believe **_{(NP)}Jean _{(VP)}to be sick**.				
	*Je	crois	**Jean**	**être**	**malade**.
	I	believe	Jean	to be	sick.

Coordination tests in French do not provide consistent evidence for small clauses' constituency. Below is an example (e) proving small clauses' constituency. The two small clauses in this example use an NP AP construction.

(e)	Louis considers **_{(NP)}Mary _{(AP)}funny** and **_{(NP)}Bill _{(AP)}stupid**.						
	Louis	considère	**[Marie**	**drôle]**	et	**[Bill**	**stupide]**
	Louis	considers	Marie	funny	and	Bill	stupid

However, the example (f) below makes an incorrect prediction about constituency.

(f)	Louis gave [a book to Mary yesterday] and [a painting to Barbara the day before].																
	Louis	a	donné	**[un**	**livre**	**à**	**Marie**	**hier]**	et	**[une**	**peinture**	**à**	**Barbara**	**le**	**jour**	**d'**	**avant]**.
	Louis	have	give+past	[a	book	to	Mary	yesterday]	and	[a	painting	to	Barbara	the	day	of	yesterday.]

Sportiche provides two possible interpretations of this data: either coordination is not a reliable constituency test or the current theory of constituency should be revised to include strings such as the ones predicted above.

==== Lithuanian (Balto-Slavic) ====
Lithuanian small clauses may occur in a NP NP or NP AP construction. NP PP constructions are not small clauses in Lithuanian as the PP does not enter into a predicative relationship with the NP. The example (a) below is of an NP NP construction. The example (b) below is of an NP AP construction. While the English translation of the sentence includes the auxiliary verb "was", it is not present in Lithuanian.

(a)	Wilson proclaimed **_{(NP)}Cagan _{(NP)}a nobleman**.			
	Wilsonas	paskelbė	**Kaganą**	**bajoru**.
	Wilson-NOM	proclaimed	Cagan	nobleman.

(b)	The Supreme Court declared that **_{(NP)}the protest (was) _{(AP)}well-founded**.					
	Aukščiausias	teismas	pripažino	kad	**protestas**	**pagrįstas**
	Supreme	Court-NOM	proclaimed	that	protest-NOM	well-formed

In Lithuanian, small clauses may be moved to the front of the sentence to become the topic. This suggests that the small clause operates as a single unit, or a constituent. Note that the sentence in example (c) in English is ungrammatical so it is marked with an asterisk, but the sentence is grammatical in Lithuanian.

(c)	***[_{(NP)}Her _{(NP)}an immature brat]** he considers.				
	**[Ją**	**nesubrendusia**	**mergiote]**	jis	laiko.
	[Her-ACC	immature	brat]	he-NOM	considers.

The phrase her an immature brat cannot be split up in example (d), which provides further evidence that the small clause behaves as a single unit.

(d)	***_{(NP)}Her** he considers **_{(NP)}an immature brat**.				
	***Ją**	jis	laiko	**nesubrendusia**	**mergiote**.
	*Her-ACC	he-NOM	considers	immature	brat.

==== Mandarin (Sinitic) ====
In Mandarin, a small clause does not only lack a verb and tense, but also the presence of functional projections. The reason for this is that the lexical entries for particular nouns in Mandarin not only contain the categorical feature for nouns, but also for verbs. Thus even with the lack of functional projections, nominals can be predicative in a small clause. (a) illustrates a complement small clause: it has no tense-marking, only a DP subject and an NP predicate. However, the semantic difference between Mandarin Chinese and English with regards to its small clauses are represented by example (b) and (c). Though (b) is the embedded small clause in the previous example, it cannot be a matrix clause. Despite having the same sentence structure, a small clause consisting of a DP and an NP, due to the ability of a nominal expression to also belong to a second category of verbs, example (c) is a grammatical sentence. This is evidence that there are more restrictive constraints on what is considered a small clause in Mandarin Chinese, which requires further research.

a. I consider **him a student.**
我	当	**他**	**学生**
Wǒ	dāng	**tā**	**xuéshēng**
I	consider	**him**	**student**

b. He is a student.
***他**	**学生**
***tā**	**xuéshēng**
**he**	**student**

c. He is Taiwanese.
**他**	**臺灣**	**人**
**tā**	**taiwan**	**rén**
**He**	**taiwan**	**-ese**

Below is case of special usage of small clause used with the possessive verb yǒu. The small clause is underlined.

Zhangsan is (at least) as tall as his older brother.
张三	有	**他**	**哥哥**	**高**
Zhāngsān	yŏu	**tā**	**gēgē**	**gāo**
Zhangsan	have	his	older brother	tall

Here, the possessive verb yǒu takes a small clause complement in order to make a degree comparison between the subject and indirect object. Due to the following AP gāo, here the possessive verb yǒu expresses a limit of the degree of tallness. It is only with a small clause complement that this uncommon degree use of the possessive verb can be communicated.

=== Variable constituent order ===
==== Brazilian Portuguese ====
In Brazilian Portuguese, there are two types of small clauses: free small clauses and dependent small clauses.

Dependent small clauses are similar to English in that they consist of an NP XP in a predicative relation. Like many other Romance languages, Brazilian Portuguese has free subject-predicate inversion, although it is restricted here to verbs with single arguments. Dependent small clauses may appear in either a standard, as in example (a), or an inverted form, as in example (b).

(a)	[subject-predicate] order				(b)	inverted [predicate-subject] order			
	Considero	**os**	**meninos**	**inocentes**.		Considero	**_{(AP)}inocentes**	**_{(NP)}os**	**meninos**.
	consider-1SG	the-PL	boys	innocent-PL.		consider-1SG	innocent-PL	the-PL	boys.
	I consider **_{(NP)}the boys _{(AP)}innocent**.					I consider **_{(NP)}the boys _{(AP)}innocent**.			

In contrast, free small clauses cannot occur with subject-predicate order: in example (c), using an [NP AP] order renders the sentence. Free small clauses only occur in the inverted form: in example (d) the small clause has an [XP NP] order, specifically an [AP NP] order. The classification of free small clauses is under debate. Some linguists argue that these free small clauses are actually cleft sentences with finite tense, while other linguists believe that free small clauses are tense phrases without inflected tense on the surface.

*(c)	[subject-predicate] order				(d)	inverted [predicate-subject] order			
	**_{(NP)}A**	**sua**	**casa**	**_{(AP)}bonita!**		**_{(AP)}Bonita**	**_{(NP)}a**	**sua**	**casa!**
	the	your	house	beautiful		beautiful	the	your	house
	*['How beautiful your house is'!]					'How beautiful your house is!'			

==== Spanish ====
In Spanish, like many Romance languages, there is some flexibility in small clause construction due to the flexibility in word order. This is posited to be due to the fact that Spanish is an example of a language that is discourse-prominent and agreement-oriented. This passing of features onto the v allows a separation of the object from the verb when the focus of the sentence changes. The final position in a sentence is reserved for the focus as seen by the differences in (a) and (b).

(a)	Juan ate **_{(NP)}the meat _{(AP)}raw**.			
	Juan	comió	**la carne**	**cruda**.
	Juan	ate	the meat	raw.

(b)	Juan ate **_{(NP)}the meat _{(AP)}raw**.			
	Juan	comió	**cruda**	**la carne**.
*	Juan	ate	raw	the meat.

The difference in preference for one construction over the other ([XP NP] versus [NP XP]) is determined by discourse features. Refer to the following two examples. In (c) the establish topic is the XP, AP in this case, meaning the information we are seeking is the NP.

(c)	**_{(NP)}Whom do you consider _{(AP)}very clever?**.		
	¿A quién	consideras	muy lista?
	to whom	consider_{-PRES.2.SG}	very clever_{-FEM.SG}

Answer

(d)	**I consider Susana _{(AP)}very clever**.		
(i)	Considero	muy lista	a Susana
	consider_{-PRES.1SG}	very clever_{-FEM.SG}	to Susana
(ii)#	Considero	a Susana	muy lista
	consider_{-PRES.1SG}	to Susana	very clever_{-FEM.SG}

In the following example (e) the reverse is true. We are given the NP in the question and are seeking the information of the XP.

(e)	**How do you consider _{(NP)}Susana?**.		
	¿Cómo	consideras	a Susana?
	how	consider_{-PRES.2.SG}	to Susana

Answer

(f)	**I consider Susana _{(AP)}very clever**.		
(i)#	Considero	muy lista	a Susana
	consider_{-PRES.1SG}	very clever_{-FEM.SG}	to Susana
(ii)	Considero	a Susana	muy lista
	consider_{-PRES.1SG}	to Susana	very clever_{-FEM.SG}

Notice in (d) and (f) that the English answer remains the same regardless of the question, but in Spanish, one ordering is preferred over the other. When the new information being presented is the XP, the construction preferred is [NP XP]. This is because the sentence-final position is reserved for focus.

It is worth noting that the non-preferred formations (d)(ii) and (f)(i) can be accepted as grammatical if the new information is given the prosodic stress or the established information is destressed, and there is a longer pause between the two constituents, making it right-dislocated.

==== Greek ====
Greek is another example of a language that is discourse-prominent and agreement-oriented, allowing features to be passed onto the v. This allows for flexibility in word order depending on the changing focus of the small clause. This example can be shown in (a) and (b). The construction can either take [XP NP] or [NP XP] formations with the focused constituent appearing sentence-finally.

(a)	John ate **_{(NP)}the meat _{(AP)}raw**.			
	janis	efaγe	**to kreas**	**omo**.
	John	ate	the meat	raw.

(b)	John ate **_{(NP)}the meat _{(AP)}raw**.			
	janis	efaγe	**omo**	**to kreas**.
*	Joan	ate	raw	the meat.

The difference in preference for one construction over the other is determined by discourse features. Newly given information is considered the focus of the sentence and is therefore preferred in sentence-final position. Refer to examples (c) and (e). In (c) the information we are given is the XP (AP in this case) and the information we are seeking is the DP. This means that the preferred construction is [XP DP]. The reverse is true of example (e).

(c)	**_{(NP)}Whom do you consider _{(AP)}very clever?**.		
	pjon	θeoris	poli eksipno?
	who_{-MSC.ACC}	consider_{-2SG}	very clever_{-MSC.SG.ACC}

Answer

(d)	**I consider John _{(AP)}very clever**.		
(i)	θeoris	poli eksipno	to jani
	consider_{-PRES.1SG}	very clever_{-MSC.SG.ACC}	the John_{-ACC}
(ii)#	θeoris	to jani	poli eksipno
	consider_{-PRES.1SG}	the John_{-ACC}	very clever_{-FEM.SG}

(e)	**How do you consider _{(NP)}John?**.		
	ti	θeoris	to jani?
	what_{-NEUT.ACC}	consider_{-2SG}	the John_{-ACC}

Answer

(f)	**I consider John _{(AP)}very clever**.		
(i)#	θeoris	poli eksipno	to jani
	consider_{-PRES.1SG}	very clever_{-MSC.SG.ACC}	the John_{-ACC}
(ii)	θeoris	to jani	poli eksipno
	consider_{-PRES.1SG}	the John_{-ACC}	very clever_{-FEM.SG}

It is worth noting that the non-preferred formations (d)(ii) and (f)(i) can be accepted as grammatical if the new information not in sentence-final position is given the emphatic stress.

=== Expressive exclamatives ===
==== English ====
Expressive Small Clauses, like SCs are verbless and the noun does not carry descriptive content but instead carries expressive content. Expressive Small Clauses are evidence that small clauses learned in early development, last until adulthood for language speakers. ESCs are illustrated in (a). Expressive small clauses are never used in an argument position of the phrase as seen in (b-i) and do not generally occur within the embedded clause of a sentence as seen in (b-ii). Both of the examples below are ungrammatical. The bolded constituents are the ESCs.

(a)
Oh, you fool!
You idiot!
You nincompoop!

(b)
(i)	***You fool** should read more carefully
(ii)	*I consider **you nincompoop/fool**

Unlike ESCs in English, Japanese ESCs differ in two ways: second person pronouns are not used, and ESCs sometimes appear in argument position. The example below shows a well-formed ESC in Japanese.

(a)	This fool!		
	Ko	-no	baka
	This	-no	fool

==== Japanese ====
The phrase in (a) illustrates the pattern found in Japanese ESCs: [NP_{1}—no—NP_{2}]. (a) illustrates the use of a proximate demonstrative in NP_{1} position. Additionally, first person pronouns, kinship terms, proper names, and other nouns with a vocative use are able to appear in NP_{1} position—except for the intermediate demonstrative so (the/that) which is not permitted in ESCs.

(b)	You fool!		
??	Anata	no	baka
	You _{2SG}	no	fool

While (b) is not ungrammatical, it sounds odd and is uncommonly used. This is also true of other second person pronouns in Japanese: omae, kisama, and temee (in progressively impolite forms).

(c)	Hey Yamada, that fool Tanaka made a mistake again.									
	Oi	Yamada	**Tanaka**	**no**	**baka**	ga	mata	shippai	-shita	yo
	Hey	Yamada	**Tanaka**	**no**	**fool**	_{NOM}	again	mistake	-did	_{PART}

(c) illustrates the use of an ESC in argument position. Notably, ESCs in argument positions lack contextual requirements found in regular ESCs. Japanese ESCs that are not found in argument position require the addressee to be the same as the noun in NP_{1} position. (c) shows that the addressee of the sentence (Yamada) does not need to be the same as the referent of the ESCs in argument position (Tanaka).

=== Information structure ===
==== English: intonation ====
Because English is agreement-prominent, there is inflexible SC word order and a heavy importance on intonational focus. Though both answers in English use the same words, focus is given by prosodic stress.

(a)
Question	Who do you consider clever?
Answer	I consider Susan very clever.

(b)
Question	How do you consider Susan?
Answer	I consider Susan very clever.

==== Spanish: word order and intonation ====
Spanish has a flexible SC word order, and word order determines focus but prosodic stress is able to be used to make non-preferred constructions felicitous. These examples show the non-felicitous construction but they would be accepted by speakers if the underlined constituents are given emphatic stress and precede a long pause.

(c)
Question	Whom do you consider clever?
	¿A quién consideras muy lista?
Answer	Considero a Susan muy lista
	consider-PRES.1SG to Susana very clever-FEM.SG
	I consider Susan very clever.

(d)
Question	How do you consider Susana?
	¿Cómo consideras a Susana?
Answer	Considero muy lista a Susana
	consider-PRES.1SG very clever-FEM.SG to Susana
	*I consider very clever Susana.

Cross-linguistic Comparisons Table
Language	Intonational Focus	Word Order Flexibility	Expressive Small Clauses	Agreement-prominent	Discourse-prominent
English	✓	X	✓	✓	X
French					
Brazilian Portuguese		✓		✓	✓
Spanish	✓*	✓		✓	✓
Greek	✓*	✓		✓	✓
Japanese			✓	X	✓

== See also ==
- Balancing and deranking
- Constituent
- Constituent order
- Dependency grammar
- Exceptional case-marking
- Information structure
- Phrase structure grammar
- Raising
- Subcategorization

== Literature ==
- Aarts, B. 1992. Small clauses in English: the non-verbal types. Berlin and New York: Mouton de Gruyter.
- Borsley, R. 1991. Syntactic theory: A unified approach. London: Edward Arnold.
- Chomsky, N. 1981. Lectures on government and binding: The Pisa lectures. Berlin:Mouton de Gruyter.
- Chomsky, N. 1986. Barriers. Cambridge, MA: MIT Press.
- Culicover, P. 1997. Principles and parameters: An introduction to syntactic theory. Oxford, UK: Oxford University Press.
- Culicover, P. and R. Jackendoff. 2005. Simpler syntax. Oxford, UK: Oxford University Press.
- Haegeman, L. 1994. Introduction to government and binding theory, 2nd edition. Oxford, UK: Blackwell.
- Haegeman, L. and J. Guéron 1999. English grammar: A generative perspective. Oxford, UK: Blackwell Publishers.
- Matthews, P. 2007. Syntactic relations: A critical survey. Cambridge, UK: Cambridge University Press.
- Ouhalla, J. 1994. Transformational grammar: From rules to principles and parameters. London: Edward Arnold.
- Wardhaugh, R. 2003. Understanding English grammar, second edition. Malden, MA: Blackwell Publishing.
