= Tensed-S condition =

Proposal in transformational grammar

The Tensed-S condition (where S stands for "Sentence") is a condition proposed in Noam Chomsky (1973) which essentially stipulates that certain classes of syntactic transformational rules cannot apply across clause boundaries. The condition is formalised as follows:

Tensed-S condition (TSC) "No rule can involve X, Y in the structure ... X ... [α... Y ...] ... where α is a tensed sentence." (Chomsky 1973: 238)

The rule accounts for such phenomena as the lack of passivization (a process which turns an active voice sentence into a passive voice one) in sentence (2) below:

(1) The footballers are believed [to be talented]

(2) *The footballers are believed [are talented]

Based on the assumption that "The footballers" originates inside the square brackets in both sentences (as the thematic subject of the predicate "be talented"), the TSC prohibits its raising (via A-movement) out of the finite clause in (2), but not the non-finite clause in (1).

The TSC (along with the Specified subject condition (SSC) also has implications for binding theory in conjunction with a simple rule of disjoint reference (which stipulated that any pronoun following a noun phrase (NP) antecedent in the same sentence, has disjoint reference with it; the rule applies anywhere unless it is blocked). The disjoint reference rule can apply in examples like (3) and (4) (which is an ECM verb structure) below, but is blocked from applying by the TSC in sentences (5) and (6) – where there are clause boundaries – thereby allowing the pronoun to refer back to the antecedent.

(3) *John_{i} likes him_{i}

(4) *John_{i} believes him_{i} to like Mary

(5) John_{i} said that Mary likes him_{i}

(6) John_{i} said that he_{i} likes Mary

The way the TSC accounted for binding as well as movement phenomena (such as the passivization examples above), was influential for much subsequent research which tried to reduce binding and movement to the same set of principles (see Kayne (2002) for a recent implementation). The subsequent binding conditions A and B of Chomsky (1981) essentially replaced the TSC (as well as the SSC), and it is no longer a part of the toolkit of current researchers.
