= Tim Stowell =

Linguist and academic administrator

- Born: 1954 (age 71–72); Ottawa

Academic background
- Education: Massachusetts Institute of Technology (PhD)

Academic work
- Discipline: Linguistics
- Institutions: University of California, Los Angeles

Tim Stowell is Distinguished Research Professor Emeritus of Linguistics at the University of California, Los Angeles. Prior to his retirement, he served as Dean of the Humanities Division.

== Education and career ==
Stowell was born in Ottawa in 1954. He earned his PhD in linguistics at MIT in 1981 and was a fellow at the Netherlands Institute for Advanced Study during the academic year 1996–1997.

== Research ==
Stowell works on generative syntax, and is best known for his postulation of small clauses.

== Selected publications ==
- Stowell, Timothy A. 1981. Origins of phrase structure (Thesis). Massachusetts Institute of Technology. hdl:1721.1/15626.
