= Balancing and deranking =

Linguistic term

In linguistics, balancing and deranking are terms used to describe the form of verbs used in various types of subordinate clauses and also sometimes in co-ordinate constructions.

- A verb form is said to be balanced if it is identical to forms used in independent declarative clauses
- A subordinate verb form is said to be deranked if it cannot be used in independent declarative clauses

== Deranked verb forms ==
Verb forms that occur in subordinate clauses of various languages that cannot occur in independent clauses are of various types, but there do exist some typical patterns that differentiate these forms from main-clause verb forms in the same language.

1. There are verb forms that possess the same type of person and tense marking as the verb forms used in independent declarative clauses, but differ in mood. Typical examples include such forms as subjunctives and irrealis moods. In the Eskimo–Aleut languages, there are special "dependent moods" used only in subordinate clauses.
2. There are verb forms that have the same distinctions of person, tense and aspect as are found in main-clause verbs, but which indicate them using special forms distinct from those of main clause verbs.
3. There are verb forms that do not have the distinctions of person, tense and aspect found in main-clause verbs, such as participles. These are used for certain types of subordinate clauses in English like "Being so busy, I couldn't come home."
4. There are verb forms that add extra morphemes never found on main clause verbs. Often these are adpositions or case suffixes.

== Subordination deranking hierarchy ==
Languages that use deranking for their subordinate-clause verb forms do so according to a definite pattern.

There are relatively few languages that use deranked verb forms for all subordinate clauses (examples are found amongst the Tungusic and Salishan languages), but most languages with significant verb inflection use deranking for at least some of their subordinate clauses. Exceptions can be found only amongst certain rigidly head-marking languages such as Ainu and Lakhota. Languages with deranking far down (rightward) on the hierarchy are most typically those with extensive nominal case systems. This is because in their presence information expressed by person marking on the verb is already expressed on nouns. If relations of core noun phrases are marked only on the verb, it is less uneconomic to express them in a dependent clause.

The distribution of balancing and deranking in languages that do not belong to one of the two polar types briefly discussed in the previous page follows a definite hierarchy. If balancing is used at any point, it is used for all points below it on the following list ("to the right" in traditional wording of the deranking hierarchy) Relevant clauses for each example are italicised.

1. Modals and phasals (e.g. "I begin to run")
2. Purpose clauses (e.g. "I went into the phone booth in order to ring up my friend")
3. Desideratives (e.g. "I want to write a letter") and manipulatives (e.g. "I made John fight")
4. Perception (e.g. "I see the bus passing")
5. "Before", "when" and "after", plus nominative or absolutive relativisation.
6. Reason (e.g. "I cannot leave him alone, because he's gone mad") and reality condition (e.g. "If capitalism did not cause the Great Depression, government was responsible"), plus accusative or ergative relativisation.
7. Knowledge (e.g. "I know that the weather will be very hot") and propositional attitude (e.g. "I think that we should stay at home today"), plus oblique and indirect object relativisation.
8. Utterance (e.g. "He said that he was tired").

=== Explanations for the deranking hierarchy ===
The commonly accepted explanation for the hierarchy outlined in the previous section is that the types of relation at the top of the deranking hierarchy are much more semantically integrated than those at the bottom. Being semantically integrated means that the events in the main and subordinate clauses are linked, which is true of purpose, perception, "before", "when" and "after" clauses, but not of those further rightward in the hierarchy. This integration leads to the use of verb forms not marked for tense, person or aspect, since they are much simpler than verb forms with these markers.

Relations that are temporal and imply that the dependent event takes place within a particular time reference relative to the main event favour verb forms that are unmarked for tense or aspect for the same reason. This is why temporal relations like "before", "when" and "after" come above relationships that have no temporal implication of this type like conditionals.

Another factor influencing use of deranking is lack of realisation of the dependent event, which often leads in purpose, desiderative and manipulative clauses to the use of moods that cannot be used in independent clauses.

== See also ==
- Small clause
