= Exceptional case-marking =

Linguistics phenomenon

Exceptional case-marking (ECM), in linguistics, is a phenomenon in which the subject of an embedded infinitival verb seems to appear in a superordinate clause and, if it is a pronoun, is unexpectedly marked with object case morphology (him not he, her not she, etc.). The unexpected object case morphology is deemed "exceptional". The term ECM itself was coined in the Government and Binding grammar framework although the phenomenon is closely related to the accusativus cum infinitivo constructions of Latin. ECM-constructions are also studied within the context of raising. The verbs that license ECM are known as raising-to-object verbs. Many languages lack ECM-predicates, and even in English, the number of ECM-verbs is small. The structural analysis of ECM-constructions varies in part according to whether one pursues a relatively flat structure or a more layered one.

== Examples ==
The ECM-construction is licensed by a relatively small number of verbs in English (e.g., believe, judge, prove, want, let, etc.):

Tim believes him to be innocent. – Exceptional case-marking of the object/subject him.
We judge them to be ridiculous. – Exceptional case-marking of the object/subject them.
The prosecutor proved her to be guilty. – Exceptional case-marking of the object/subject her.
They want us to be respectful. – Exceptional case-marking of the object/subject us.

The strings in bold are the ECM-constructions. The pronouns are marked with object case morphology, but they function semantically as the subjects of the infinitival verbs to their right, i.e., they acquire their theta roles from the verb to their right. Many ECM-verbs allow the same meaning to be expressed with a full object clause (a finite clause), e.g.:

Tom believes that he is innocent. – ECM-construction alternates with full clause.
The prosecutor proved that she is guilty. – ECM-construction alternates with full clause.
They want that we are respectful. – ECM-construction alternates with full clause.

Since the meaning across these clauses remains consistent, one tendency has been to view the ECM-material (i.e., the material in bold in the first four examples) as a type of small clause that is analogous to the full clausal counterpart. On this approach, the object forms a constituent with the infinitive to its right. The primary trait of the ECM-object/subject is that it is not a semantic argument of the matrix predicate, which means that it is not semantically selected by the matrix verb. In this area, ECM-constructions should not be confused with control constructions, since control predicates semantically select their object (e.g., They told us to start).

== Structural analyses ==
An interesting aspect of ECM-constructions concerns the underlying structure. There are two basic possibilities in this area: a flat structure or a more layered one. The following trees illustrate the "flat" analysis. For each example, both a constituency-based analysis of a phrase structure grammar and a dependency-based analysis of a dependency grammar are shown:

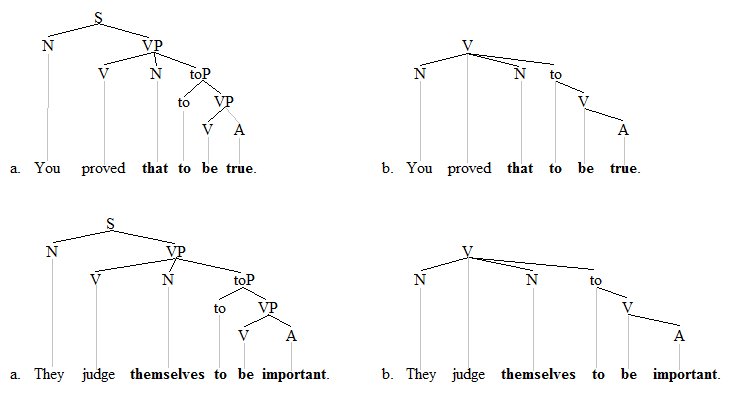

The phrase structure grammar trees are the a-trees on the left, and the dependency grammar trees are the b-trees on the right. Both types of analysis show a relatively flat structure insofar as the material in bold consists of two separate sister constituents. The object/subject pronouns are shown as dependents of the matrix verb each time. The two do NOT form a single constituent with the predicates to their right. The alternative, more layered analysis of these sentences might be as follows:

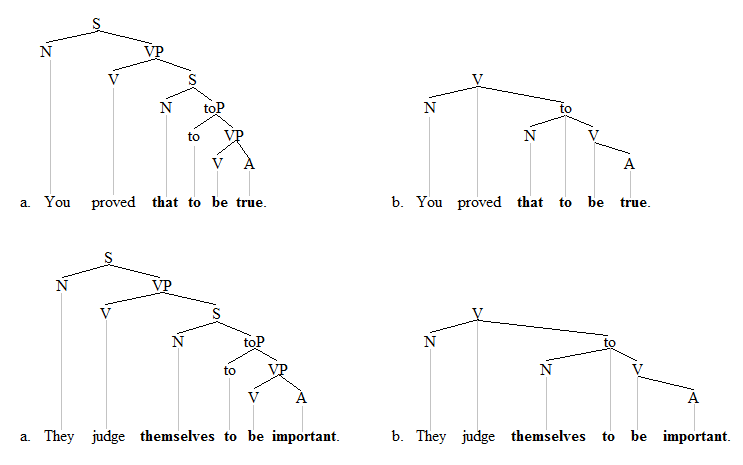

The constituency-based trees are again on the left, and the dependency-based trees on the right. The material in bold now forms a single constituent. This is accomplished in the constituency trees by adding the clause node S, and in the dependency trees, it is accomplished by subordinating the ECM object/subject to the particle to. One can now debate which of the two analyses is better. The more layered analysis has the advantage that it accommodates the insight that the subject/object constituent is a semantic argument of the infinitival verb. The flat analysis has the advantage that it is more consistent with data delivered by operational considerations: the object morphology on the pronoun (e.g. him, her, them, etc.), the ability of the object/subject to become the subject in the passive counterpart (e.g. That was proved to be true), the obligatory appearance of the reflexive pronoun when coindexation occurs with the subject (e.g. They_{1} judge themselves_{1}/*them_{1} to be important), and the inability of constituency tests to clearly identify a clausal constituent (e.g. Topicalization: ^{??}That to be true, you proved).

The more layered analysis is favored in the GB framework and a variation of it certainly obtains in current Minimalism as well. The flat analysis is certainly the one preferred by dependency grammars.

== See also ==
- Accusativus cum infinitivo
- Control (linguistics)
- Dependency grammar
- Phrase structure grammar
- Raising (linguistics)
- Small clause

== Literature ==
- Chomsky, N. 1986. Barriers. Cambridge, MA: The MIT Press.
- Bresnan, J. (ed.). 1982. The mental representation of grammatical relations. Cambridge, MA: The MIT Press.
- Cowper, E. 2009. A concise introduction to syntactic theory: The government-binding approach. Chicago: The University of Chicago Press.
- Falk, Y. 2001. Lexical-Functional Grammar: An introduction to parallel constraint-based syntax. Stanford, CA: CSLI Publications.
- Lasnik, H. 1999. Minimalist analysis. Malden, MA: Blackwell Publishers.
- Napoli, D. 1993. Syntax: Theory and problems. New York: Oxford University Press.
- Ouhalla, J. 1994. Transformational grammar: From rules to principles and parameters. London: Edward Arnold.
