= Accusative and infinitive =

Type of grammatical construction

In grammar, accusative and infinitive (also Accusativus cum infinitivo or accusative plus infinitive, frequently abbreviated ACI or A+I) is the name for a syntactic construction first described in Latin and Greek, also found in various forms in other languages such as English and Dutch. In this construction, the subject of a subordinate clause is put in the accusative or objective case and the verb appears in the infinitive form.

== Description ==
This construction can be illustrated in English:

- I believe him to be rich.

This contains a finite verb (believe) followed by a noun phrase in the accusative (him) and a non-finite verb (to be). Underlying the ACI section is the independent statement.

- He is rich

which has become an embedded clause. Thus, the special valency of the verb believe causes the subject of to be to appear unintuitively in the object case. The key element of an ACI is that the accusative is not the object of the infinitive, and this distinguishes it from a construction like I hope to see him soon, where the accusative pronoun him is a straightforward object and no special rules are in operation.

== In Latin ==
The accusative and infinitive is the usual grammatical construction by means of which Classical Latin expressed indirect statements, that is, statements which report what someone has said, thought, felt, etc. Whereas a direct statement would be

"I am a good student," says Julia.

the indirect statement might be

Julia says that she is a good student.

Classical Latin tends not to use a conjunction equivalent to the English "that" to introduce indirect statements. Rather, an accusative subject is used with an infinitive to develop the appropriate meaning. For example, translating the aforementioned example into Latin:

Iūlia dīcit sē bonam discipulam esse.
literally: 'Julia says herself to be a good student.'

Sē here is an accusative reflexive pronoun referring back to the subject of the main verb i.e. Iūlia ; esse is the infinitive "to be."

Note that the tense of the infinitive, translated into English, is relative to the tense of the main verb. Present infinitives, also called contemporaneous infinitives, occur at the time of the main verb. Perfect infinitives (prior infinitives) occur at a time before the main verb. Future infinitives (subsequent infinitives) occur at a time after the main verb. For example, the contemporaneous infinitive in this sentence,

Dīxērunt eum iuvāre eam.

would still be translated "They said he was helping her," even though iuvāre is a present infinitive.

Passive periphrastic infinitives, i.e. the gerundive + esse, indicate obligatory action in indirect statements, e.g. Gāius dīcit litterās tibi scrībendās esse, "Gaius says that the letters ought to be written by you."

In late classical and Medieval Latin, the ACI gradually gave way to a construction with quod with the subjunctive.

Iūlia dīcit quod bona discipula sit.

This was probably the more common usage in spoken Latin and is the form used consistently in Jerome's Vulgate, which reflects a colloquial style. It is also the equivalent of the Greek indirect statement introduced by ὅτι. This is the origin of the construction in the modern Romance languages such as French:

Julia dit qu'elle est une bonne élève.

== In English ==
In English, the ACI construction occurs more than in other European languages, normally with verbs of wishing, saying and perceiving, as well as in causative clauses. Depending on the valency of the main verb in the sentence, English may use the infinitive with or without the infinitive marker to.

- I would like the President to be successful.
- I saw her go.
- I wouldn't want them to think me unfair.
- I imagine that to be true.
- I believe there to be no alternative.
- She considers herself to have a fine reputation.
- She made me eat the vegetables.
- The teacher let the children go home early.
- Please don't have me get down on my knees.

In the framework of transformational grammar, the English construction is known as exceptional case-marking.

== Sources ==
- Klein, Maarten (2010). Zwart, Jan-Wouter; de Vries, Mark (eds.). "The accusative infinitive in Latin, English and Dutch". Structure Preserved: Studies in syntax for Jan Koster. Linguistik Aktuell/Linguistics Today. 164. Amsterdam: John Benjamins Publishing Company: 231–237.
- Wheelock, Frederic M. (2005). Wheelock's Latin. HarperCollins. ISBN 0-06-078371-0.
