= Binding (linguistics) =

Distribution of anaphoric elements

In linguistics, binding is the phenomenon in which anaphoric elements such as pronouns are grammatically associated with their antecedents. For example, in the English sentence "Mary saw herself", the anaphor "herself" must refer to "Mary": its referent is "bound" by the antecedent. Binding can be licensed or blocked in certain contexts or syntactic configurations, e.g. the pronoun "her" cannot be bound by "Mary" in the English sentence "Mary saw her". While all languages have binding, restrictions on it vary even among closely related languages. Binding has been a major area of research in syntax and semantics since the 1970s and, as the name implies, is a core component of government and binding theory. (Note: Hornstein (2018) gives a good overview of government & binding theory (GB) and how its mechanics gave rise to the minimalist program. This includes the how titular "binding" plays a major role in the GB framework.)

== Some basic examples and questions ==
The following sentences illustrate some basic facts of binding. The words that bear the index i should be construed as referring to the same person or thing. (Note: Examples like the ones given here that illustrate aspects of binding can be found in most accounts of binding phenomena. See for instance Radford (2004:85f) and Carnie (2013:153f.).)

a. Fred_{i} is impressed with himself_{i}. – Indicated reading obligatory
b. *Fred_{i} is impressed with him_{i}. – Indicated reading impossible

a. *Susan_{i} asked Arthur to help herself_{i}. – Indicated reading impossible
b. Susan_{i} asked Arthur to help her_{i}. – Indicated reading easily possible

a. Sue_{i} said she_{i} was tired. – Indicated reading easily possible
b. *She_{i} said Sue_{i} was tired. – Indicated reading impossible

a. Fred's_{i} friends venerate him_{i}. – Indicated reading easily possible
b. ^{?}His_{i} friends venerate Fred_{i}. – Indicated reading unlikely

These sentences illustrate some aspects of the distribution of reflexive and personal pronouns. In the first pair of sentences, the reflexive pronoun must appear for the indicated reading to be possible. In the second pair, the personal pronoun must appear for the indicated reading to be possible. The third pair shows that at times a personal pronoun must follow its antecedent, and the fourth pair further illustrates the same point, although the acceptability judgement is not as robust. Based on such data, one sees that reflexive and personal pronouns differ in their distribution and that linear order (of a pronoun in relation to its antecedent or postcedent) is a factor influencing where at least some pronouns can appear. A theory of binding should be capable of predicting and explaining the differences in distribution seen in sentences like these. It should be able to answer questions like: What explains where a reflexive pronoun must appear as opposed to a personal pronoun? When does linear order play a role in determining where pronouns can appear? What other factor (or factors) beyond linear order help predict where pronouns can appear?

== Binding domains ==
The following three subsections consider the binding domains that are relevant for the distribution of pronouns and nouns in English. The discussion follows the outline provided by the traditional binding theory (see below), which divides nominals into three basic categories: reflexive and reciprocal pronouns, personal pronouns, and nouns (common and proper). (Note: The three-way division between reflexive and reciprocal pronouns, personal pronouns, and nouns is discussed, for instance, in Carnie (2013:147ff.). Note, however, that the terminology varies depending on the author.)

=== Reflexive and reciprocal pronouns ("anaphors") ===
When one examines the distribution of reflexive pronouns and reciprocal pronouns (which are often subsumed under the general category of "anaphor"), one sees that there are certain domains that are relevant, a "domain" being a syntactic unit that is clause-like. Reflexive and reciprocal pronouns often seek their antecedent close by, in a binding domain that is local, e.g.

a. Fred_{i} praises himself_{i}. – Indicated reading obligatory
b. *Fred_{i} praises him_{i}. – Indicated reading impossible

a. The girls_{i} like each other_{i}. – Indicated reading obligatory
b. *The girls_{i} like them_{i}. – Indicated reading impossible

These examples illustrate that there is a domain within which a reflexive or reciprocal pronoun should find its antecedent. The a-sentences are fine because the reflexive or reciprocal pronoun has its antecedent within the clause. The b-sentences, in contrast, do not allow the indicated reading, a fact illustrating that personal pronouns have a distribution that is different from that of reflexive and reciprocal pronouns. A related observation is that a reflexive and reciprocal pronoun often cannot seek its antecedent in a superordinate clause, e.g.

a. Susan thinks that Jill_{i} should praise herself_{i}. – Indicated reading (almost) obligatory
b. ^{??}Susan_{i} thinks that Jill should praise herself_{i}. – Indicated reading very unlikely

a. They asked whether the girls_{i} like each other_{i}. – Indicated reading (almost) obligatory
b. ^{??}They_{i} asked whether the girls like each other_{i}. – Indicated reading very unlikely

When the reflexive or reciprocal pronoun attempts to find an antecedent outside of the immediate clause containing it, it fails. In other words, it can hardly seek its antecedent in the superordinate clause. The binding domain that is relevant is the immediate clause containing it.

=== Personal pronouns ===
Personal pronouns have a distribution that is different from reflexive and reciprocal pronouns, a point that is evident with the first two b-sentences in the previous section. The local binding domain that is decisive for the distribution of reflexive and reciprocal pronouns is also decisive for personal pronouns, but in a different way. Personal pronouns seek their antecedent outside of the local binding domain containing them, e.g.

a. Fred_{i} asked whether Jim mentioned him_{i}. – Indicated reading easily possible
b. *Fred asked whether Jim_{i} mentioned him_{i}. – Indicated reading impossible

a. Gina_{i} hopes that Wilma will mention her_{i}. – Indicated reading easily possible
b. *Gina hopes that Wilma_{i} will mention her_{i}. – Indicated reading impossible

In these cases, the pronoun has to look outside of the embedded clause containing it to the matrix clause to find its antecedent. Hence based on such data, the relevant binding domain appears to be the clause. Further data illustrate, however, that the clause is actually not the relevant domain:

a. Fred_{i} likes the picture of him_{i}. – Indicated reading possible

b. Gina_{i} has heard the rumor about her_{i}. – Indicated reading possible

Since the pronouns appear within the same minimal clause containing their antecedents in these cases, one cannot argue that the relevant binding domain is the clause. The most one can say based on such data is that the domain is "clause-like".

=== Nouns ===
The distribution of common and proper nouns is unlike that of reflexive, reciprocal, and personal pronouns. The relevant observation in this regard is that a noun is often reluctantly coreferential with another nominal that is within its binding domain or in a superordinate binding domain, e.g.

a. Susan_{i} admires herself_{i}. – Indicated reading obligatory
b. #Susan_{i} admires Susan_{i}. – Indicated reading possible, but special context necessary

a. Fred_{i} thinks that he_{i} is the best. – Indicated reading easily possible
b. #Fred_{i} thinks that Fred_{i} is the best. – Indicated reading possible, but special context necessary

The readings indicated in the a-sentences are natural, whereas the b-sentences are very unusual. Indeed, sentences like these b-sentences were judged to be impossible in the traditional binding theory according to Condition C (see below). Given a contrastive context, however, the b-sentences can work, e.g. Susan does not admire Jane, but rather Susan_{i} admires Susan_{i}. One can therefore conclude that nouns are not sensitive to binding domains in the same way that reflexive, reciprocal, and personal pronouns are.

== Linear order ==
The following subsections illustrate the extent to which pure linear order impacts the distribution of pronouns. While linear order is clearly important, it is not the only factor influencing where pronouns can appear.

=== Linear order is a factor ===
A simple hypothesis concerning the distribution of many anaphoric elements, of personal pronouns in particular, is that linear order plays a role. In most cases, a pronoun follows its antecedent, and in many cases, the coreferential reading is impossible if the pronoun precedes its antecedent. The following sentences suggest that pure linear can indeed be important for the distribution of pronouns:

a. Jim's_{i} grade upsets him_{i}. – Indicated reading easily possible
b. ^{?}His_{i} grade upsets Jim_{i}. – Indicated reading unlikely

a. Larry's_{i} family avoids him_{i}. – Indicated reading easily possible
b. ^{?}His_{i} family avoids Larry_{i}. – Indicated reading unlikely

a. We spoke to Tina's_{i} mother about her_{i}. – Indicated reading easily possible
b. ^{?}We spoke to her_{i} mother about Tina_{i}. – Indicated reading unlikely

While the coreferential readings indicated in these b-sentences are possible, they are unlikely. The order presented in the a-sentences is strongly preferred. The following, more extensive data sets further illustrate that linear order is important:

a. Sam_{i} mentioned twice that he_{i} was hungry. – Indicated reading easily possible
b. *He_{i} mentioned twice that Sam_{i} was hungry. – Indicated reading impossible
c. That Sam_{i} was hungry, he_{i} mentioned twice. – Indicated reading possible
d. ^{?}That he_{i} was hungry, Sam_{i} mentioned twice. – Indicated reading unlikely

a. You asked Fred_{i} twice when he_{i} would study. – Indicated reading easily possible
b. *You asked him_{i} twice when Fred_{i} would study. – Indicated reading impossible
c. When Fred_{i} would study, you asked him_{i} twice. – Indicated reading possible
d. ^{?}When he_{i} would study, you asked Fred_{i} twice. – Indicated reading unlikely

While the acceptability judgements here are nuanced, one can make a strong case that pure linear order is at least in part predictive of when the indicated reading is available. The a- and c-sentences allow the coreferential reading more easily than their b- and d-counterparts.

=== Linear order is not the only factor ===
While linear order is an important factor influencing the distribution of pronouns, it is not the only factor. The following sentences are similar to the c- and d-sentences in the previous section insofar as an embedded clause is present.

a. When the boys_{i} are at home, they_{i} play video games. – Indicated reading easily possible
b. When they_{i} are at home, the boys_{i} play video games. – Indicated reading possible

a. If Susan_{i} tries, she_{i} will succeed. – Indicated reading easily possible
b. If she_{i} tries, Susan_{i} will succeed. – Indicated reading possible

While there may be a mild preference for the order in the a-sentences here, the indicated reading in the b-sentences is also available. Hence linear order is hardly playing a role in such cases. The relevant difference between these sentences and the c- and d-sentences in the previous section is that the embedded clauses here are adjunct clauses, whereas they are argument clauses above. The following examples involve adjunct phrases: (Note: The Mary- and Zelda-examples given here appear originally in Reinhart's (1983) book on the distribution of anaphors. Note, however, that many of Reinhart's original acceptability judgments were inaccurate, hence the acceptability judgments given here do not match Reinhart's examples.)

a. Rosa_{i} found a scratch in Ben's picture of her_{i}. – Indicated reading easily possible
b. *She_{i} found a scratch in Ben's picture of Rosa_{i}. – Indicated reading impossible
c. ^{?}In Ben's picture of Rosa_{i}, she_{i} found a scratch. – Indicated reading unlikely
d. In Ben's picture of her_{i}, Rosa_{i} found a scratch. – Indicated reading possible

a. Zelda_{i} spent her sweetest hours in her_{i} bed.– Indicated reading easily possible
b. *She_{i} spent her sweetest hours in Zelda's_{i} bed. – Indicated reading impossible
c. ^{??}In Zelda's_{i} bed, she_{i} spent her sweetest hours. – Indicated reading very unlikely
d. In her_{i} bed, Zelda_{i} spent her sweetest hours. – Indicated reading possible

The fact that the c-sentences marginally allow the indicated reading whereas the b-sentences do not at all allow this reading further demonstrates that linear order is important. But in this regard, the d-sentences are telling, since if linear order were the entire story, one would expect the d-sentences to be less acceptable than they are. The conclusion that one can draw from such data is that there are one or more other factors beyond linear order that are impacting the distribution of pronouns.

== Configuration vs. function ==
Given that linear order is not the only factor influencing the distribution of pronouns, the question is what other factor or factors might also be playing a role. The traditional binding theory (see below) took c-command to be the all-important factor, but the importance of c-command for syntactic theorizing has been extensively criticized in recent years. (Note: Bruening (2014) produces an extensive criticism of the validity of c-command for syntactic theorizing.) The primary alternative to c-command is functional rank. These two competing concepts (c-command vs. rank) have been debated extensively and they continue to be debated. C-command is a configurational notion; it is defined over concrete syntactic configurations. Syntactic rank, in contrast, is a functional notion that resides in the lexicon; it is defined over the ranking of the arguments of predicates. Subjects are ranked higher than objects, first objects are ranked higher than second objects, and prepositional objects are ranked lowest. The following two subsections briefly consider these competing notions.

=== Configuration (c-command) ===
C-command is a configurational notion that acknowledges the syntactic configuration as primitive. Basic subject-object asymmetries, which are numerous in many languages, are explained by the fact that the subject appears outside of the finite verb phrase (VP) constituent, whereas the object appears inside it. Subjects therefore c-command objects, but not vice versa. C-command is defined as follows:

C-command
Node A c-commands node B if every node dominating A also dominates B, and neither A nor B dominates the other. (Note: The definition of c-command is taken from Carnie (2013:127).)

Given the binary division of the clause (S → NP + VP) associated with most phrase structure grammars, this definition sees a typical subject c-commanding everything inside the verb phrase (VP), whereas everything inside the VP is incapable of c-commanding anything outside of the VP. Some basic binding facts are explained in this manner, e.g.

a. Larry_{i} promoted himself_{i}. – Indicated reading obligatory

b. *Himself_{i} promoted Larry_{i}. – Indicated reading impossible; sentence ungrammatical

Sentence a is fine because the subject Larry c-commands the object himself, whereas sentence b does not work because the object Larry does not c-command the subject himself. The assumption has been that within its binding domain, a reflexive pronoun must be c-commanded by its antecedent. While this approach based on c-command makes a correct prediction much of the time, there are other cases where it fails to make the correct prediction, e.g.

The picture of himself_{i} upsets Larry_{i}. – Indicated reading possible

The reading indicated is acceptable in this case, but if c-command were the key notion helping to explain where the reflexive can and must appear, then the reading should be impossible since himself is not c-commanded by Larry. (Note: The insight that the reflexive pronoun can be embedded inside a subject NP and at the same time be coreferential with the object NP is one of the main insights presented in Pollard and Sag's (1992) account of what has become known as "exempt anaphors", i.e. reflexive pronouns that are not bound by their antecedent.)

As reflexive and personal pronouns occur in complementary distribution, the notion of c-command can also be used to explain where personal pronouns can appear. The assumption is that personal pronouns cannot c-command their antecedent, e.g.

a. When Alice_{i} felt tired, she_{i} lay down. – Indicated reading easily possible

b When she_{i} felt tired, Alice_{i} lay down. – Indicated reading possible

In both examples, the personal pronoun she does not c-command its antecedent Alice, resulting in the grammaticality of both sentences despite reversed linear order.

=== Function (rank) ===
The alternative to a c-command approach posits a ranking of syntactic functions (SUBJECT > FIRST OBJECT > SECOND OBJECT > PREPOSITIONAL OBJECT). (Note: A number of approaches to binding build on a hierarchy of syntactic functions, although the terminology they employ usually varies. In particular, the HPSG and LFG frameworks posit a basic hierarhcy of syntactic functions. See Pollard and Sag (1994:121), who build on the notion of o-command, and see Bresnan (2001:212), who employs the "rank" terminology used here.) Subject-object asymmetries are addressed in terms of this ranking. Since subjects are ranked higher than objects, an object can have the subject as its antecedent, but not vice versa. With basic cases, this approach makes the same prediction as the c-command approach. The first two sentences from the previous section are repeated here:

a. Larry_{i} promoted himself_{i}. – Indicated reading obligatory

b. *Himself_{i} promoted Larry_{i}. – Indicated reading impossible; sentence ungrammatical

Since the subject outranks the object, sentence a is predictably acceptable, the subject Larry outranking the object himself. Sentence b, in contrast, is bad because the subject reflexive pronoun himself outranks its postcedent Larry. In other words, this approach in terms of rank is assuming that within its binding domain, a reflexive pronoun may not outrank its antecedent (or postcedent). Consider the third example sentence from the previous section in this regard:

The picture of himself_{i} upset Larry_{i}. – Indicated reading possible

The approach based on rank does not require a particular configurational relationship to hold between a reflexive pronoun and its antecedent. In other words, it makes no prediction in this case, and hence does not make an incorrect prediction. The reflexive pronoun himself is embedded within the subject noun phrase, which means that it is not the subject and hence does not outrank the object Larry.

A theory of binding that acknowledges both linear order and rank can at least begin to predict many of the marginal readings. (Note: Langacker's study (1969), which is one of the earliest explorations of binding phenomena, combined two factors to predict binding possibilities. Hence the concept that a combination of factors influences binding data has a long tradition.) When both linear order and rank combine, acceptability judgments are robust, e.g.

a. Barbara_{i} hopes that she_{i} will be promoted. – Linear order and rank combine to make the indicated reading easily possible.
b. *She_{i} hopes that Barbara_{i} will be promoted. – Linear order and rank combine to make the indicated reading impossible.

a. Bill's_{i} grade upset him_{i}. – Linear order alone makes the indicated reading possible; rank is not involved.
b. ^{?}His_{i} grade upset Bill_{i}. – Linear order alone makes the indicated reading unlikely; rank is not involved.

This ability to address marginal readings is something that an approach combining linear order and rank can accomplish, whereas an approach that acknowledges only c-command cannot do the same.

== Traditional binding theory: Conditions A, B, and C ==
The exploration of binding phenomena began in the 1970s and interest peaked in the 1980s with Government and Binding Theory, a grammar framework in the tradition of generative syntax that is still prominent today. (Note: For presentations of the traditional binding theory, see for instance Radford (2004:85ff) and Carnie (2013:147ff.).) The theory of binding that became widespread at that time serves now merely as reference point (since it is no longer believed to be correct). This theory distinguishes between 3 different binding conditions: A, B, and C. The theory classifies nominals according to two features, [±anaphor] and [±pronominal], which are binary. The binding characteristics of a nominal are determined by the values of these features, either plus or minus. Thus, a nominal that is [-anaphor, -pronominal] is an R-expression (referring expression), such as a common noun or a proper name. A nominal that is [-anaphor, +pronominal] is a pronoun, such as he or they, and a nominal that is [+anaphor, -pronominal] is a reflexive pronoun, such as himself or themselves. Note that the term anaphor here is being used in a specialized sense; it essentially means "reflexive". This meaning is specific to the Government and Binding framework and has not spread beyond this framework. (Note: Most syntax textbooks on generative grammar use the term in this way. See for instance Carnie (2013:148).)

Based on the classifications according to these two features, three conditions are formulated:

Condition A
An anaphor (reflexive) must be locally bound (have a local (nearby) antecedent).
- Thus, John_{i} washed himself_{i} obeys Condition A: the antecedent of himself, which is John, is nearby.
- In contrast, *John_{i} asked Mary to wash himself_{i} is unacceptable, because the reflexive and its antecedent are too far away from each other.

Condition B
A pronoun must not be locally bound (can have an antecedent as long as the antecedent is not local or does not c-command the pronoun).
- Thus John_{i} asked Mary to wash him_{i} obeys Condition B; John is the antecedent of him, and him is sufficiently far away.
- He_{i} washed himself_{i} also obeys Condition B; the antecedent himself is local but does not c-command the pronoun He.
- On the other hand, *John_{i} washed him_{i} is unacceptable; the antecedent John is local and c-commands the pronoun him.

Condition C
An R-expression cannot be bound. It cannot corefer with anything that c-commands it.
- Thus *He_{i} asked Mary to wash John_{i} is unacceptable; the pronoun He c-commands its antecedent, the R-expression John.
- John_{i} washed John_{i} is unacceptable; the first R-expression c-commands the second R-expression, so they cannot corefer.

While the theory of binding that these three conditions represent is no longer held to be valid, as mentioned above, the associations with the three conditions are so firmly anchored in the study of binding that one often refers to, for example, "Condition A effects" or "Condition B effects" when describing binding phenomena.

== See also ==
- Anaphora (linguistics) – Use of an expression whose interpretation depends on context
- Antecedent – Expression that gives its meaning to a pro-form in grammar
- C-command – Concept in generative grammar
- Coreference – Two or more expressions in a text with the same referent
- Government and binding theory – Theory of syntax
- Proform – Word or form that substitutes for another word
- Raising – Concept in linguistics
