= Raising (syntax) =

Concept in linguistics

In linguistics, raising constructions involve the movement of an argument from an embedded or subordinate clause to a matrix or main clause. A raising predicate/verb appears with a syntactic argument that is not its semantic argument but rather the semantic argument of an embedded predicate. In other words, the sentence is expressing something about a phrase taken as a whole. For example, in they seem to be trying, "to be trying" (the predicand of trying) is the subject of seem. English has raising constructions, unlike some other languages.

The term raising has its origins in the transformational analysis of such constructions; the constituent in question is seen as being "raised" from its initial deep structure position, as the subject of the embedded predicate, to its surface structure position in the matrix predicate/verb. Raising predicates/verbs are related to control predicates, although there are important differences between the two predicate/verb types.

== Examples ==
There are at least two types of raising predicates/verbs: raising-to-subject verbs and raising-to-object predicates. Raising-to-object predicates overlap to a large extent with so-called ECM-verbs (= exceptional case-marking). These types of raising predicates/verbs are illustrated with the following sentences:

a. They seem to be trying. – Seem is a raising-to-subject verb.
b. Prices appear to be increasing. – Appear is a raising-to-subject verb.
c. You seem to be impatient. – Seem is a raising-to-subject verb.

a. Fred wants us to help. – Want can be a raising-to-object predicate.
b. That proves him to be hiding something. – Prove can be a raising-to-object predicate.
c. She predicts there to be a problem. – Predict can be a raising-to-object predicate.

The primary trait of raising predicates/verbs like these is that they are not semantically selecting one of their dependents. The raising-to-subject verbs are not selecting their subject dependent, and the raising-to-object predicates are not selecting their object dependent. These dependents appear to have been raised from the lower predicate.

== Alternation with it-extraposition ==
Raising predicates/verbs can be identified in part by the fact that they alternatively take a full clause dependent and can take part in it-extraposition, e.g.

a. Tom seems to have won the race.
b. It seems that Tom won the race. – Raising-to-subject verb seem occurs with it-extraposition.

a. Larry appears to be doing the work.
b. It appears that Larry is doing the work. – Raising-to-subject predicate verb appear occurs with it-extraposition.

a. Sam believed someone to know the answer.
b. Sam believed it that someone knew the answer. – Raising-to-object predicate believe occurs with it-extraposition.
c. Sam believed that someone knew the answer. – Raising-to-object predicate believe occurs with clausal object argument.

a. That proves Susan to be a jackass.
b. That proves it that Susan is a jackass. – Raising-to-object predicate prove occurs with it-extraposition.
c. That proves that Susan is a jackass. – Raising-to-object predicate prove occurs with clausal object argument.

Raising predicates/verbs can appear with it–extraposition and/or a full clausal dependent. They appear to be subcategorizing for a propositional argument.

== Raising-to-subject verbs vs. auxiliary verbs ==
The raising-to-subject verbs seem and appear are similar to auxiliary verbs insofar as both verb types have little to no semantic content. The content that they do have is functional in nature. In this area, auxiliary verbs cannot be viewed as separate predicates; they are, rather, part of a predicate. The raising-to-subject verbs seem and appear are similar insofar it is difficult to view them as predicates. They serve, rather, to modify a predicate. That this is so can be seen in the fact that the following pairs of sentences are essentially synonymous:

a. Fred does not seem to have done it.
b. Fred seems not to have done it. – Position of the negation is flexible.
c. Fred seems to not have done it. – Infinitival splitting occurs.

a. Mary does not appear to like pudding.
b. Mary appears not to like pudding. – Position of the negation is flexible.
c. Mary appears to not like pudding. – Infinitival splitting occurs.

The fact that position of the negation can change without influencing the meaning is telling. It means that the raising-to-subject verbs can hardly be viewed as predicates.

While raising-to-subject verbs are like auxiliary verbs insofar as they lack the content of predicates, they are unlike auxiliaries in syntactic respects. Auxiliary verbs undergo subject-aux inversion, raising-to-subject verbs do not. Auxiliary verbs license negation, raising-to-subject verbs do so only reluctantly:

a. Fred is happy.
b. Is Fred happy? – Auxiliary verb be takes part in subject-auxiliary inversion.
c. Fred is not happy. – Auxiliary verb be licenses negation.

a. Fred seems happy.
b. *Seems Fred happy? – Raising-to-subject verb seem cannot take part in subject-auxiliary inversion.
c. ^{??}Fred seems not happy. – Raising-to-subject verb seem can hardly license negation.

a. Susan should stay.
b. Should Susan stay? – Modal auxiliary should takes part in subject-auxiliary inversion.
c. Susan should not stay. – Modal auxiliary should can license negation.

a. Susan appears to be staying.
b. *Appears Susan to be staying? – Raising-to-subject verb appear cannot take part in subject-auxiliary inversion.
c. ^{?}Susan appears not to be staying. – Raising-to-subject verb appear reluctantly licenses negation.

Raising-to-object verbs are also clearly NOT auxiliary verbs. Unlike raising-to-subject verbs, however, raising-to-object verbs have clear semantic content, so they are hence indisputably predicates.

== Representing raising ==
The fact that the raised constituent behaves as though it is a dependent of the higher predicate is generally reflected in the syntax trees that are employed to represent raising structures. The following trees are illustrative of the type of structures assumed for raising-to-object predicates. Both constituency-based trees of phrase structure grammar and dependency-based trees of dependency grammar are employed here:

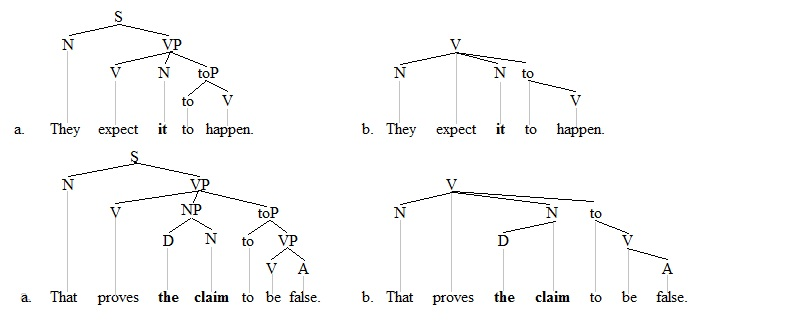

The constituency-based trees are the a-trees on the left, and the dependency-based trees are the b-trees on the right. While the structures assumed here can be disputed - especially the constituency structures - the trees all show the main stance toward raising structures. This stance is that the "subject" of the lower predicate appears as a dependent of the higher predicate - the relevant constituents are in bold. Relatively flat structures are assumed to accommodate this behavior. Both it and the claim are shown as dependents of expects and proves, respectively, although they are semantic arguments of the lower predicates to happen and to be false, respectively.

A number of empirical considerations support the relatively flat structures shown here. That is, empirical considerations support the position of the "raised" constituent as a dependent of the matrix predicate/verb. These dependents can appear in object form, they can appear as the subject of passive sentences, and they can appear as reflexives coindexed with the matrix subjects:

a. We expect him to help. – Pronoun him appears in object form.
b. He is expected to help. – Object pronoun becomes subject in passive.
c. He_{1} expects himself_{1} to help. – Reflexive is coindexed with subject.

a. You proved her to be competent. – Pronoun her appears in object form.
b. She was proved to be competent. – Object pronoun becomes subject in passive.
c. She_{1} proved herself_{1} to be competent. – Reflexive is coindexed with subject.

This behavior speaks strongly for the general analysis reflected in the trees, namely that the "raised" constituent is a dependent of the higher predicate.

== Raising vs. control ==
An understanding of raising is significantly expanded by comparing and contrasting raising with control. Examine the following (dependency) trees:

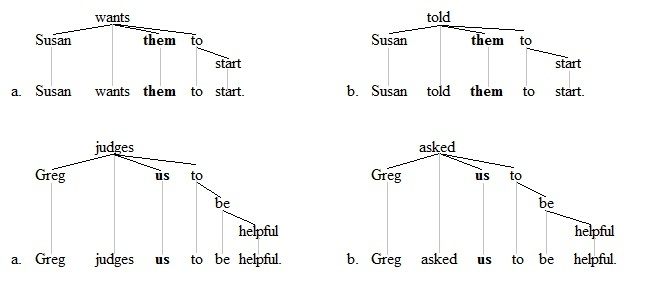

The a-trees contain the raising predicates wants and judges, whereas the b-trees contain the control predicates told and asked. Despite the fact that structures assumed for these different predicate types are essentially the same, there is a major distinction to be drawn. This distinction is that the control predicates semantically select their objects, whereas the raising predicates do not. In other words, the object is a semantic argument of the control predicate in each case, whereas it is not an argument of the raising predicate. This situation obtains despite the fact that both predicate types take the object to be the "subject" of the lower predicate.

The distinction between raising-to-object and control predicates is identified using the there-insertion diagnostic. Expletive there can appear as the object (or subject) of raising predicates, but it cannot appear as the object of control predicates, e.g.:

a. Sam judges there to be a problem. – Expletive there can appear as the object of a raising-to-object predicate.
b. *Sam asked there to be a problem. – Expletive there cannot appear as the object of an object control predicate.

a. We want there to be a revision. - Expletive there can appear as the object of a raising-to-object predicate.
b. ^{??}We helped there (to) be a revision. - Expletive there cannot appear as the object of an object control predicate.

Since the raising predicates place no semantic restrictions on their object dependents, expletive there is free to appear. In contrast, object control predicates do place semantic restrictions on their object arguments, which means expletive there usually cannot appear.

== See also ==
- Negative raising
- Control
- Dependency grammar
- Exceptional case marking
- Phrase structure grammar
- Right node raising
