= English clause element =

Linguistics concept

English clause elements are the minimum set of units needed to describe the linear structure of a clause.

Traditionally, they are partly identified by terms such as subject and object. Their distribution in a clause is partly indicated by traditional terms defining verbs as transitive or intransitive.

Modern English reference grammars are in broad agreement as to a full inventory, but are not unanimous in their terminology or their classification. Clause elements may be identified by unique terms. However, they may be identified by more general terms and further classified according to the type of verb.

== A Comprehensive Grammar of the English Language ==
This grammar by Randolph Quirk, Sidney Greenbaum, Geoffrey Leech, and Jan Svartvik recognises seven types of clause structure and seven positions where elements may be identified. The elements of the clause structures are labelled with these terms and abbreviations:

| | | Subject (S) | Verb (V) | Object (O) | | Complement (C) | | Adverbial (A) |
| | | Subject (S) | Verb (V) | Indirect | Direct | Subject | Object | Adverbial (A) |
|---|---|---|---|---|---|---|---|---|
| S t r u c t u r e s | a. | Someone | was laughing. | | | | | |
| S t r u c t u r e s | b. | My mother | enjoys | | parties. | | | |
| S t r u c t u r e s | c. | The country | became | | | totally independent. | | |
| S t r u c t u r e s | d. | I | have been | | | | | in the garden. |
| S t r u c t u r e s | e. | Mary | gave | the visitor | a glass of milk. | | | |
| S t r u c t u r e s | f. | Most people | consider | | these books | | rather expensive. | |
| S t r u c t u r e s | g. | You | must put | | all the toys | | | upstairs. |

These patterns correspond to a classification of the verb:

| | Clause type | Verb type |
|---|---|---|
| a. | SV | INTRANSITIVE |
| b. | SVO | TRANSITIVE (MONOTRANSITIVE) |
| c. | SVC | COPULAR |
| d. | SVA | COPULAR |
| e. | SVOO | TRANSITIVE (DITRANSITIVE) |
| f. | SVOC | TRANSITIVE (COMPLEX TRANSITIVE) |
| g. | SVOA | TRANSITIVE (COMPLEX TRANSITIVE) |

The example sentences contain only obligatory clause elements. The same seven patterns are recognised for longer sentences with added optional adverbials.

a′. Someone [S] was laughing [V] loudly [A] in the next room [A].

b′. My mother [S] usually [A] enjoys [V] parties [O] very much [A].

c′. In 1945 [A] the country [S] became [V] totally [A] independent [C].

d′. I [S] have been [V] in the garden [A] all the time [A] since lunch [A].

e′. Mary [S] willingly [A] gave [V] the visitor [O] a glass of milk [O].

f′. Most people [S] consider [V] these books [O] rather [A] expensive [C], actually [A].

g′. You [S] must put [V] all the toys [O] upstairs [A] immediately [A].

== The Longman Grammar of Spoken and Written English ==
This grammar recognises the seven patterns as above, but using partly different terms and abbreviations. In addition, it recognises a clause type with a different verb type: a prepositional verb such as rely on which is followed by a prepositional object.

It also recognises two further types of adverbial. In i, to put it mildly is loosely attached to the clause It would be unfortunate. It expresses the attitude of the speaker/writer. The grammar uses the term and abbreviation stance adverbial (A_{s}). In j, nevertheless functions as a connection between the clause and a preceding clause. The grammar uses the term and abbreviation linking adverbial (A_{l}).

| | Subject (S) | Verb Phrase (V) | Indirect (O_{i}) | Direct (O_{d}) | Prepositional (O_{p}) | Subject (P_{s}) | Object (P_{O}) | Circumstance (A_{c}) | Stance (A_{s}) | Linking (A_{l}) |
| | Subject (S) | Verb Phrase (V) | Object | | | Predicative | | Adverbial |
| a. | Someone | was laughing. |
| b. | My mother | enjoys | | parties. |
| c. | The country | became | | | | totally independent. |
| d. | I | have been | | | | | | in the garden. |
| e. | Mary | gave | the visitor | a glass of milk. |
| f. | Most people | consider | | these books | | | rather expensive. |
| g. | You | must put | | all the toys | | | | upstairs. |
| h. | One | relied on | | | other people. |
| i. | It | would be | | | | unfortunate, | | | to put it mildly. |
| j. | It | moves, | | | | | | | | nevertheless. |

Thus the grammar recognises the patterns:

a. Someone [S] was laughing [V].
b. My mother [S] enjoys [V] parties [O_{d}].
c. The country [S] became [V] totally independent [P_{s}].
d. I [S] have been [V] in the garden [A_{c}].
e. Mary [S] gave [V] the visitor [O_{i}] a glass of milk [O_{d}].
f. Most people [S] consider [V] these books [O_{d}] rather expensive [P_{o}].
g. You [S] must put [V] all the toys [O_{d}] upstairs [A_{c}].
h. One [S] relied on [V] other people [O_{p}].
i. It [S] would be [V] unfortunate [P_{s}], to put it mildly [A_{s}].
j. It [S] moves [V], nevertheless [A_{l}].

In clauses of types a-h the order of elements is normally fixed. However, stance adverbials and linking adverbials are more mobile. For example,

i′. To put it mildly [A_{s}], it [S] would be [V] unfortunate [P_{s}].
j′. Nevertheless [A_{l}], it [S] moves [V].

== The Cambridge Grammar of the English Language ==
| | Subject (S) | Verb (V) | Object (O) | | Complement (C) | | Adverbial (A) |
| | Subject (S) | Verb (V) | Indirect | Direct | Subject | Object | Adverbial (A) |
| a. | Someone | was laughing. |
| b. | My mother | enjoys | | parties. |
| c. | The country | became | | | totally independent. |
| d. | I | have been | | | | | in the garden. |
| e. | Mary | gave | the visitor | a glass of milk. |
| f. | Most people | consider | | these books | | rather expensive. |
| g. | You | must put | | all the toys | | | upstairs. |

This grammar recognises a basic distinction between predicator, complement and adjunct.

At this basic level, it recognises the elements numbered above with the following terms and abbreviations:

1. Complement (C)
2. Predicator (P)
3-7. Complement (C)

The term Adjunct (A) is reserved for elements which are not obligatory.

This produces the analyses:

d. I [C] have been [P] in the garden [C].
d′. I [C] have been [P] in the garden [C] all the time [A] since lunch [A].
g. You [C] must put [P] all the toys [C] upstairs [C].
g′. You [C] must put [P] all the toys [C] upstairs [C] immediately [A].

At a more detailed level, the grammar distinguishes the complements between subject and predicative complement

1. Subject (S)
2. Predicator (P)
3. Object (indirect) (O^{i})
4. Object (direct) (O^{d})
5-6. Predicative complement (PC)
7. Locative complement (LC)

Predicative complements are distinguished according to the verb type. This produces the following analyses:

| Verb type | | Example clause |
|---|---|---|
| Intransitive | a. | Someone [S] was laughing [P]. |
| Transitive | b. | My mother [S] enjoys [P] parties [O^{d}]. |
| Complex-Intransitive | c. | The country [S] became [P] totally independent [PC]. |
| Complex-Intransitive | d. | I [S] have been [P] in the garden [LC]. |
| Ditransitive | e. | Mary [S] gave [P] the visitor [O^{i}] a glass of milk [O^{d}]. |
| Complex-Transitive | f. | Most people [S] consider [P] these books [O^{d}] rather expensive [PC]. |
| Complex-Transitive | g. | You [S] must put [P] all the toys [O^{d}] upstairs [LC]. |
