= Complement =

Complement may refer to:

== The arts ==
- Complement (music), an interval that, when added to another, spans an octave
  - Aggregate complementation, the separation of pitch-class collections into complementary sets
- Complementary color, in the visual arts

== Biology and medicine ==
- Complement system (immunology), a cascade of proteins in the blood that form part of innate immunity
- Complementary DNA, DNA reverse transcribed from a mature mRNA template
- Complementarity (molecular biology), a property whereby double stranded nucleic acids pair with each other
- Complementation (genetics), a test to determine if independent recessive mutant phenotypes are caused by mutations in the same gene or in different genes

== Grammar and linguistics ==
- Complement (linguistics), a word or phrase having a particular syntactic role
  - Subject complement, a word or phrase adding to a clause's subject after a linking verb
  - Object complement, a word or phrase adding to the direct object of a verb phrase.
- Complementary distribution
- Phonetic complement
- Complementary, a type of opposite in lexical semantics (sometimes called an antonym)

== Mathematics ==
=== Algebra ===
- Complement (group theory)
- Complementary subspaces
- Orthogonal complement
- Schur complement

=== Algorithms ===
- Complement (complexity), relating to decision problems and complexity classes
- Complement operator (regular expressions)
- Method of complements, in computer science
  - Radix complement
  - Diminished radix complement
  - Ones' complement
  - Two's complement

=== Discrete mathematics ===
- Complement graph
  - Self-complementary graph, a graph which is isomorphic to its complement
- Complemented lattice

=== Geometry ===
- Complement of an angle, the difference between a right angle (90 degrees) and a given angle
- Knot complement
- Complement of a point, the dilation of a point in the centroid of a given triangle, with ratio −1/2

=== Logic ===
- Complement (set theory)
- Negation, also known as "logical complement"
- Bitwise complement

== Other uses ==
- Complement good (economics), a good often consumed together with another good
- Ship's complement, the crew

== See also ==
- Complementarity (disambiguation)
- Compliment (disambiguation)
- Complimentary (disambiguation)
