= Traditional grammar =

Framework for the description of the structure of a language

Traditional grammar (also known as classical grammar) is a framework for the description of the structure of a language or group of languages. The roots of traditional grammar are in the work of classical Greek and Latin philologists. The formal study of grammar based on these models became popular during the Renaissance.

Traditional grammars may be contrasted with more modern theories of grammar in theoretical linguistics, which grew out of traditional descriptions. While traditional grammars seek to describe how particular languages are used, or to teach people to speak or read them, grammar frameworks in contemporary linguistics often seek to explain the nature of language knowledge and ability common to all languages. Traditional grammar is often prescriptive, and may be regarded as unscientific by those working in linguistics.

Traditional Western grammars classify words into parts of speech. They describe the patterns for word inflection, and the rules of syntax by which those words are combined into sentences.

== History ==
Among the earliest studies of grammar are descriptions of Sanskrit, called vyākaraṇa. The Indian grammarian Pāṇini wrote the Aṣṭādhyāyī, a descriptive grammar of Sanskrit, sometime between the 4th and the 2nd century BCE. This work, along with some grammars of Sanskrit produced around the same time, is often considered the beginning of linguistics as a descriptive science, and consequently wouldn't be considered "traditional grammar" despite its antiquity. Although Pāṇini's work was not known in Europe until many centuries later, it is thought to have greatly influenced other grammars produced in Asia, such as the Tolkāppiyam, a Tamil grammar generally dated between the 2nd and 1st century BCE.

The formal study of grammar became popular in Europe during the Renaissance. Descriptive grammars were rarely used in Classical Greece or in Latin through the Medieval period. During the Renaissance, Latin and Classical Greek were broadly studied along with the literature and philosophy written in those languages. With the invention of the printing press and the use of Vulgate Latin as a lingua franca throughout Europe, the study of grammar became part of language teaching and learning.

Although complete grammars were rare, Ancient Greek philologists and Latin teachers of rhetoric produced some descriptions of the structure of language. The descriptions produced by classical grammarians (teachers of philology and rhetoric) provided a model for traditional grammars in Europe. According to linguist William Harris, "Just as the Renaissance confirmed Greco-Roman tastes in poetry, rhetoric and architecture, it established ancient Grammar, especially that which the Roman school-grammarians had developed by the 4th [century CE], as an inviolate system of logical expression." The earliest descriptions of other European languages were modeled on grammars of Latin. The primacy of Latin in traditional grammar persisted until the beginning of the 20th century.

The use of grammar descriptions in the teaching of language, including foreign language teaching and the study of language arts, has gone in and out of fashion. As education increasingly took place in vernacular languages at the close of the Renaissance, grammars of these languages were produced for teaching. Between 1801 and 1900 there were more than 850 grammars of English published specifically for use in schools. Mastering grammar rules like those derived from the study of Latin has at times been a specific goal of English-language education. This approach to teaching has, however, long competed with approaches that downplay the importance of grammar instruction. Similarly in foreign or second language teaching, the grammar-translation method based on traditional Latin teaching, in which the grammar of the language being learned is described in the student's native language, has competed with approaches such as the direct method or the communicative approach, in which grammar instruction is minimized.

== Parts of speech ==
The parts of speech are an important element of traditional grammars, since patterns of inflection and rules of syntax each depend on a word's part of speech.

Although systems vary somewhat, typically traditional grammars name eight parts of speech: nouns, pronouns, adjectives, verbs, adverbs, prepositions, conjunctions, and interjections. These groupings are based on categories of function and meaning in Latin and other Indo-European languages. Some traditional grammars include other parts of speech, such as articles or determiners, though some grammars treat other groupings of words as subcategories of the major parts of speech.

The traditional definitions of parts of speech refer to the role that a word plays in a sentence, its meaning, or both.

- A noun is a name for something—whatever one wants to refer to in order to talk about it.
  - A common noun refers to something abstract: a kind of object (table, radio), a kind of living thing (cat, person), a kind of place (home, city), a kind of action (running, laughter, extinction), a kind of attribute (redness, size), a kind of relationship (closeness, partnership), or anything at all, no matter how abstract (two, god, diversity, corporation).
  - A proper noun refers to a specific thing (Jesse Owens, Felix the Cat, Pittsburgh, Zeus).
- A pronoun is a word used in place of a noun (she in place of her name).
- An adjective modifies a noun or pronoun; it describes the thing referred to (red in "My shirt is red" or "My red shirt is in the laundry.").
- A verb signifies the predicate of the sentence. That is, a verb indicates what is being asserted or asked about the subject of the sentence (is in "My shirt is red"; own in "I own this house"; ran in "Jesse Owens ran in the 1936 Olympics"). (Note: Alternately, some grammars define verbs as words that name actions or states of being.)
- An adverb modifies a verb, an adjective, other adverbs, or the whole sentence (happily in "People danced happily", "Happily, I was paid on time").
- A preposition indicates a relationship between a noun or pronoun, called the object of the preposition, and another part of the sentence. The other part of the sentence may be a noun or pronoun, a verb, or an adjective. (in in "Jesse Owens ran in the 1936 Olympics"; on in "A store on Main St. sells antique chairs")
  - The object of a preposition takes an oblique case (me in "Amanda borrowed money from me"; see Oblique case).
- A conjunction joins parts of sentences, such as nouns, verbs, or clauses, into larger units (and in "Mack Robinson and Jesse Owens ran in the 1936 Olympics"; because in "Amanda borrowed money from me because she needed to pay the rent").
- An interjection expresses emotion (Ouch!) or calls to someone (Hey in "Hey, you!").

Contemporary linguists argue that classification based on a mixture of morphosyntactic function and semantic meaning is insufficient for systematic analysis of grammar. Such definitions are not sufficient on their own to assign a word an unambiguous part of speech. Nonetheless, similar definitions have been used in most traditional grammars.

== Accidence ==
Accidence, also known as inflection, is the change of a word's form depending on its grammatical function. The change may involve the addition of affixes or else changes in the sounds of the word, known as vowel gradation or ablaut. Some words feature irregular inflection, not taking an affix or following a regular pattern of sound change.

Verbs, nouns, pronouns, and adjectives may be inflected for person, number, and gender.

The inflection of verbs is also known as conjugation. A verb has person and number, which must agree with the subject of the sentence.

Verbs may also be inflected for tense, aspect, mood, and voice. Verb tense indicates the time that the sentence describes. A verb also has mood, indicating whether the sentence describes reality or expresses a command, a hypothesis, a hope, etc. A verb inflected for tense and mood is called finite; non-finite verb forms are infinitives or participles. The voice of the verb indicates whether the subject of the sentence is active or passive in regard to the verb.

Number indicates whether the noun refers to one, two, or many instances of its kind.

Nouns, pronouns, and adjectives may also be inflected for case. The inflection of nouns, pronouns, and adjectives is also known as declension. Noun case indicates how the noun relates to other elements of the sentence (I, me in "I see Jesse" and "Jesse sees me").

A traditional means of learning accidence is through conjugation tables or declension tables, lists of the various forms of a word for a learner to memorize. The following tables present partial conjugation of the Latin verb esse and its English equivalent, be.

Partial conjugation of verb to be
	Infinitive	Present indicative						Preterite indicative					
	Infinitive	1st singular	2nd	3rd	1st plural	2nd	3rd	1st singular	2nd	3rd	1st plural	2nd	3rd
Latin	esse	sum	es	est	sumus	estis	sunt	fui	fuisti	fuit	fuimus	fuistis	fuerunt
English	be	am	are	is	are	are	are	was	were	was	were	were	were

This partial table includes only two tenses (present and preterite) and one mood (indicative) in addition to the infinitive. A more complete conjugation table for Latin would also include the subjunctive and imperative moods and the imperfect indicative, which indicates imperfective aspect. In English the imperative often has the same form as the infinitive, while the English subjunctive often has the same form as the indicative. English does not have imperfective aspect as Latin does; it has progressive and perfect aspects in addition to the simple form.

== Syntax ==
Syntax is the set of rules governing how words combine into phrases and clauses. It deals with the formation of sentences, including rules governing or describing how sentences are formed. In traditional usage, syntax is sometimes called grammar, but the word grammar is also used more broadly to refer to various aspects of language and its usage.

In traditional grammar syntax, a sentence is analyzed as having two parts, a subject and a predicate. The subject is the thing being talked about. In English and similar languages, the subject usually occurs at the beginning of the sentence, but this is not always the case. (Note: English is classified as a subject–verb–object language, since the parts of a sentence typically occur in that order. See the article Word order for further discussion.) The predicate comprises the rest of the sentence, all of the parts of the sentence that are not the subject.

The subject of a sentence is generally a noun or pronoun, or a phrase containing a noun or pronoun. If the sentence features active voice, the thing named by the subject carries out the action of the sentence; in the case of passive voice, the subject is affected by the action. In sentences with imperative mood, the subject may not be expressed.

- Zoltan ate the cake. (Zoltan, the subject of this active sentence, carried out the action of eating.)
- The cake was baked for Zora's birthday. (The cake, the subject of this passive sentence, is affected by the action of baking.)
- Bake another cake. (In this imperative sentence, the subject is not expressed. The implied subject is you.)

The predicate of a sentence may have many parts, but the only required element is a finite verb. In addition to the verb, the predicate may contain one or more objects, a subject complement, object complements, adpositional phrases (in English, these are prepositional phrases), or adverbial elements.

Some verbs (called transitive verbs) take direct objects; some also take indirect objects. A direct object names the person or thing directly affected by the action of an active sentence. An indirect object names the entity indirectly affected. In a sentence with both a direct and an indirect object, the indirect object generally appears before the direct object.

In the following sentence, the direct object, the book, is directly affected by the action; it is what is given. The indirect object, Nikolai, is indirectly affected; he receives the book as a result of it being given.

- Yuri gave Nikolai the book.

In place of an indirect object, a prepositional phrase beginning with to or for may occur after the direct object.

- Yuri gave the book to Nikolai.

A subject complement (variously called a predicative expression, predicative, predicate noun or adjective, or complement) appears in a predicate with a linking verb (also called a copula). A subject complement is a noun, adjective, or phrase that refers to the subject of the linking verb, illustrated in the following examples.

- Elizabeth is a doctor.
- Salim is clever.
- Kerli is from Estonia.

While subject complements describe or modify the subject of a linking verb, object complements describe or modify nouns in the predicate, typically direct or indirect objects, or objects of adpositions. In the following example, the phrase sun's origin is a complement of the direct object Japan.

- Chinese scholars called Japan "sun's origin".

A subject and a predicate together make up a clause.

Although some traditional grammars consider adpositional phrases and adverbials part of the predicate, many grammars call these elements adjuncts, meaning they are not a required element of the syntactic structure. Adjuncts may occur anywhere in a sentence.

Adpositional phrases can add to or modify the meaning of nouns, verbs, or adjectives. An adpositional phrase is a phrase that features either a preposition, a postposition, or a circumposition. All three types of words have similar function; the difference is where the adposition appears relative to the other words in the phrase. Prepositions occur before their complements while postpositions appear after. Circumpositions consist of two parts, one before the complement and one after.

- French prepositional phrase: sur la table ("on the table")
- Chinese postpositional phrase: 桌子上 (zhuōzi shàng, "on the table")
- Sorani Kurdish circumpostional phrase: la Kurdistân' â ("in Kurdistan")

An adverbial consists of either a single adverb, an adverbial phrase, or an adverbial clause that modifies either the verb or the sentence as a whole. Some traditional grammars consider adpositional phrases a type of adverb, but many grammars treat these as separate. Adverbials may modify time, place, or manner. Negation is also frequently indicated with adverbials, including adverbs such as English not.

== See also ==
- The Art of Grammar
- Linguistic prescription
- Pedagogical grammar
- Regular and irregular verbs
- Sentence diagram
- Syntax–semantics interface
- Uses of English verb forms
- Hypercorrection
- Term logic
