= Secondary predicate =

Predicative expression

A secondary predicate is a (mostly adjectival) predicative expression that conveys information about the subject or the object but is not the main predicate of the clause. This structure may be analysed in many different ways.

These may be resultative, as in (1) and (2) or descriptive (also called "depictive") as in (3) and (4).

(1) She painted the town red

(2) The film left me cold

(3) Susan walked around naked. (Depictive over the subject, or "subject-oriented depictive")

(4) John ate the meat raw. (Depictive over the object, or "object-oriented depictive")

== Alternative views ==
Optional depictive secondary predicates are viewed as "predicative adjuncts" by some linguists. (Huddleston & Pullum 2002)
