= Complementarity =

Complementarity may refer to:

== Physical sciences and mathematics ==
- Complementarity (molecular biology), a property of nucleic acid molecules in molecular biology
- Complementarity (physics), the principle that objects have complementary properties which cannot all be observed or measured simultaneously
- Complementarity theory, a type of mathematical optimization problem
- Quark–lepton complementarity, a possible fundamental symmetry between quarks and leptons

== Society and law ==
- Complementarianism, a theological view that men and women have different but complementary roles
- Complementary good, a good for which demand is increased when the price of another good is decreased
- An element of interpersonal compatibility in social psychology
- The principle that the International Criminal Court is a court of last resort

== See also ==
- Complementarity-determining region, part of the variable chains in immunoglobulins
- Complementary angles, in geometry
- Self-complementary graph, in graph theory
- Yin and yang, complementary relation between apparent opposites in Chinese philosophy
- Complimentary (disambiguation)
- Complement (disambiguation)
