= Nominal sentence =

Sentence without a finite verb

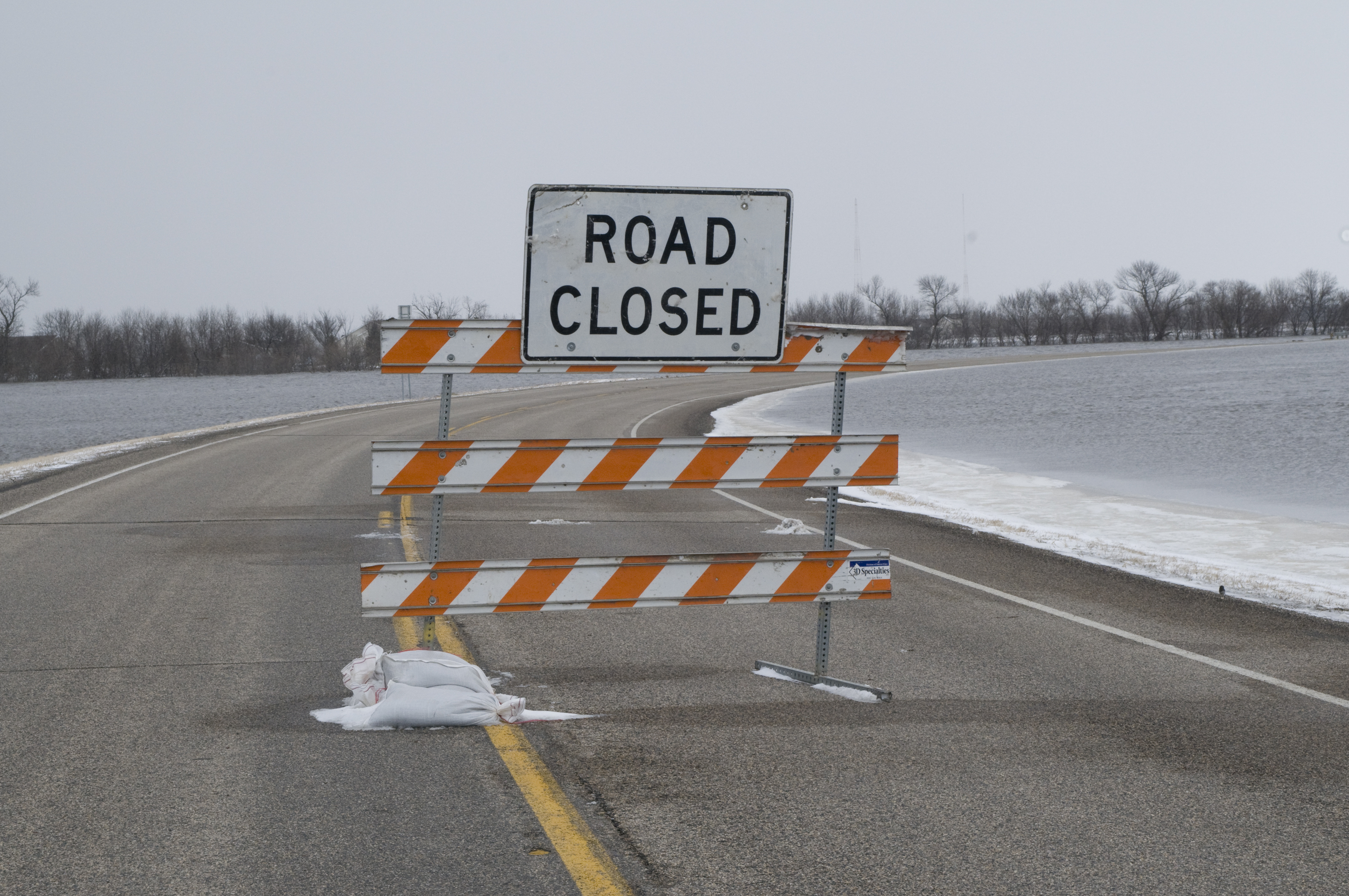
Road signs commonly use zero copula (omitting the verb to be). This sign uses the sentence "road closed" to mean "the road is closed."

In linguistics, a nominal sentence (also known as equational sentence) is a sentence without a finite verb. As a nominal sentence does not have a verbal predicate, it may contain a nominal predicate, an adjectival predicate, in Semitic languages also an adverbial predicate or even a prepositional predicate. In Egyptian-Coptic, however, as in the majority of African languages, sentences with adverbial or prepositional predicate show a distinctly different structure. The relation of nominal sentences to verbal sentences is a question of tense marking. In most languages with nominal sentences such as Russian, Arabic and Hebrew, the copular verb does not surface in indicatival present tense sentences. Conversely, these languages allow the copular verb in non-present sentences.

== History ==
Historically, nominal sentences have posited much controversy regarding their identity as an existent linguistic phenomenon. Ancient grammatical tradition did not uncover such sentences, or if they did, they were only found as an exception to the language structure. This was the view taken by the Western grammatical tradition, which began with an analysis of Ancient Greek followed by an analysis of Latin.

However, this Western/European approach to nominal sentences was not how the Arab grammarians of the early Middle Ages approached it. Arab grammarians did not feel as bound by the classical grammatical categories as did the European counterparts of that historical period. Rather, they viewed a sentence as having two basic categories: 1. a verbal sentence that begins with a verb, and 2. a nominal sentence that begins with a noun and may or may not have a verb within it.

Moving forward in the historical time period, Orientalists later borrowed the nominal sentence terminology from the early Arab grammarians, however modified it slightly to be defined solely with respect to the absence of the verbal predicate, rather than with respect to the first word of the sentence (the noun) that may or may not have a verb in it, as the Arab grammarians defined it. This slight shift in the definition of nominal sentences corresponds partly to both the Western and the Arabic grammar tradition. The Orientalists' definition agrees with the Western grammar's focus of the predicate orientation, and it supports how the Arab grammarians included a sentence category of nominal sentences (nonverbal sentences). Since this new definition of nominal sentences corresponded more accurately to the notion of non-verbal sentences, compared to the Arab definition of 'it may or may not contain a verb', the Orientalists' definition included predicate types other than verbs (nouns, adjectives, etc.).

== Syntactic structure and analyses ==
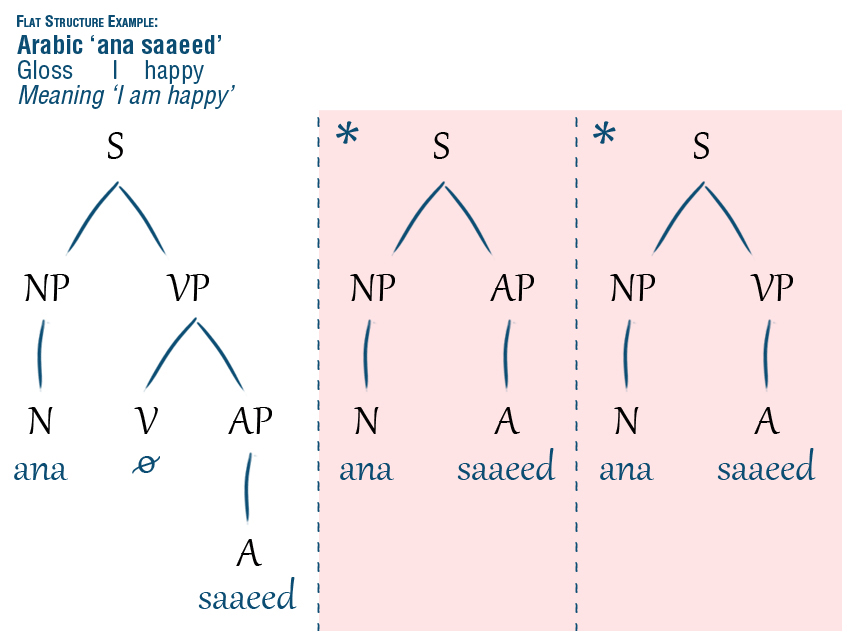
Different phrase structure trees of Arabic "I happy" according to zero copula analysis

To successfully account for the syntactic structure of a nominal sentence, there must either be a change in the phrase structure rules or a zero copula must be assumed. This is because nominal sentences cannot be accounted for using traditional phrase structure rules, which state: TP → {NP/ CP} (T) (VP). In other words, a tense phrase must consist of a noun phrase or complementizer phrase, an optional tense head, and a verb phrase. Less technically, this means each sentence must have a noun and verb component. Because there is no overt verb in a nominal sentence, this creates a challenge for the theory.

In the Arabic sentence ʾanā saʿīd (أنا سعيد), literally "I happy", which is fully grammatical in the language, there is a pronoun, ʾanā and an adjective, saʿīd. The first satisfies the sentence requirement of having a noun, but the latter being an adjective, the verb requirement remains unfulfilled. In order to allow this construction, the theory would have to be revised to state *TP → NP {VP/AP} (the * indicates that this is actually an ungrammatical construction), meaning there could be a sentence that breaks down to either a verb phrase or an adjective phrase (see the above figure). However, phrase structure rules are supposed to be universal, therefore this new rule would also allow us to generate "I happy" in English. Since this is not a grammatical sentence, this is an issue that requires attention.

Another problem is that each phrase must consist of a head which bears its name. Therefore, in a verb phrase, the head is always a verb. Again, nominal sentences like ʾanā saʿīd do not have a verb, so the verb head position in the verb phrase cannot be filled. Having a zero copula is one way to solve the problems listed above without compromising the existing syntactic theory. The verb is present, just covertly, as "null".

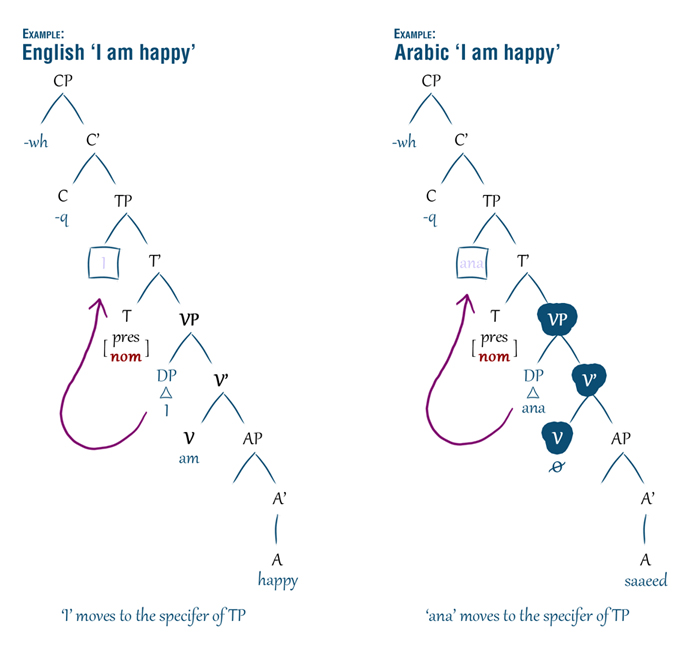
English and Arabic trees of "I am happy"

Using X-bar theory, it is possible to both account for the grammaticality of constructions such as "I happy" as well as explain how the subject DP is derived. In X-bar theory, there are no obligatory lexical categories that make up a sentence; instead, there are only general X-bar rules: the specifier rule, adjunct rule, and complement rule. Therefore, the theory accurately permits the AP "happy" as grammatical even without a verb since AP can be a complement to the T head (see aside).
Additionally, under the VP-internal subject hypothesis, the subject "I" will be generated in the specifier of VP and, using the DP movement, it will move to the specifier position of TP. Consequently, the resulting surface structure of the nominal sentence "I happy" is properly generated under this analysis.

== In English ==
Nominal sentences in English are relatively uncommon, but may be found in non-finite embedded clauses such as the one in "I consider John intelligent", where to be is omitted from John to be intelligent. They can also be found in newspaper headlines, such as "Jones Winner" where the intended meaning is with the copular verb, "Jones is the Winner". Other examples are proverbs ("More haste, less speed"); requests ("Scalpel!"); and statements of existence ("Fire in the hole!"), which are often warnings.

The omission of the verb 'to be' can also provide basis for nominal sentences. For example, in the sentence "the higher I am, the hungrier I feel", the verb 'to be' can be omitted to form a nominal sentence, thus: "The higher, the hungrier". A sentence such as "What a great day today!" is, for example, considered nominal since there are no verbs. Some questions may also drop the implied verb, for example “Which way to the park?”

== In Arabic ==
=== Present tense ===
A verbless sentence in Arabic (جملة اسمية jumla ismiyya) does not consist of a subject but rather a topic followed by a predicate. They are only possible in present tense sentences. Below are examples of verbless sentences with NP, AdjP or PP predicates.

NP predicate

ar-rajul-u mudarris-u-n
{the man} {a teacher}
the man is a teacher

AdjP predicate

ar-rajul-u marīḍ-un
{the man} sick
the man is sick

PP predicate

ar-rajulu fī l-madrasa
{the man} in {the school}
the man is in the school

All the examples above are perfectly grammatical in Arabic since they all refer to the present tense and therefore do not require verbs.

=== Past tense ===
As stated above, verbless sentences occur only in the present tense thus, a formal nominal sentence in Arabic can never express something in the past tense. That is, the past feature has to always be indicated morphologically to convey accurate information of (+past), unlike the present which can be referred to as tenseless. The following is an example of a past tense sentence in formal or written Arabic:

kān-a ar-rajul-u marīḍ-an
was {the man} sick
the man was sick

Demonstrated by the sentence above is the idea that tense is a guiding factor to the use of nominal sentences in Arabic. A sentence in the past always requires the kāna (+past) verb.

=== Negation ===
Nominal sentences can be negated in different ways depending on tense and whether or not they are embedded. The following is an example of a negative nominal sentence in the present tense, using the formal Arabic negative particle laysa:

al-ḡulām-u laysa ṭawīl-an
{the boy} not tall
the boy is not tall

The negative particle (laysa) by itself has the meaning of a present tense and it is used to negate a general existence; so it means something along the lines of "there does not exist" or "there is not". Thus, it can only negate a tenseless sentence where an overt copula is not necessary.

In order to negate a nominal sentence in the past, however, the copular verb must be included. The following is an example of a negative past sentence using the negative particle lam:

al-ḡulām-u lam yakun ṭawīl-an
{the boy} not(+PAST) is tall
the boy was not tall

The negative particle (lam) is a tense marker of (+past). Therefore, it negates a lexically present tense to refer to the past, making past negative sentences similar to the affirmative past tense sentences in that a past feature must be marked.

== In other languages ==
=== Hungarian ===
For some languages, nominal sentences are restricted to third person only. Hungarian is an example of such a language. In Hungarian, the copular verb simply expresses something that exists, such as something, someone, a place, or even time, weather, a material, an origin, a cause or purpose. In third person proposition sentences (both singular and plural), there are no copular verbs required and instead, the copular is null.

a ház magas
the house high
the house is high

=== Russian ===
In Russian, there are no restrictions on verbless propositional sentences as they can occur with all persons and all numbers (i.e., singular or plural). However, despite such restrictions and variability seen in both Arabic and Hungarian above, there are no structural differences between the languages. Instead, these differences are derived by whether or not there must be a relation with the verbal constructions and the copular verb.

вы учитель
vy učitelʹ
you teacher
you are a teacher

дом маленький
dom malenʹkij
house small
the house is small

отец работает
otec rabotaet
father works
the father is working

=== Hebrew ===
In Hebrew, sentences may or may not include verbs since verbs are optional and not at all obligatory. Also, the order of words is quite flexible such that for the sentences that do include verbs, the verb can appear either before or after the nominal predicate, adjectival predicate or prepositional predicate; the nominal predicate can appear either before or after the adjectival predicate, prepositional predicate; and so on, all of which are possible combinations that still mean the same thing. Although for the sentences that lack verbs, only two combinations are possible: either the nominal predicate appears before or after the adjectival/prepositional predicate. And like in Arabic, the copular verb is simply implied, in fact, there are no present tense forms of the verb "to be" in any stage of Hebrew, ancient or modern.

ani po
I here
I am here

ha-sus yafe
{the horse} beautiful
the horse is beautiful

=== Ancient Indo-European languages ===
In ancient Indo-European languages, verb inflections and context both play a significant role in determining the structure of the sentence as well as their translations to other languages.

Verb inflections are used to indicate person (first, second or third), number (singular, dual or plural), tense, voice, and mood. Also, personal endings, which are suffixes that attach to verbs, are specifically used to express person and number and consist of nine different forms: alternating combinations between the three persons and three numbers.

Context determines whether the simple present and present progressive (for example, "I eat" vs. "I am eating") indicates the present or future tense. This is a common phenomenon found in English as well, since the sentence "I am eating in the cafeteria" can either mean "I am eating in the cafeteria [right now]" or "I am eating in the cafeteria [next Tuesday]". Additionally, the present tense can be used to talk about either the present or the past and which one it implies is determined by context. For instance, "We went to the mall [yesterday]. James buys a new bike", where without the context (yesterday) the action of buying would take place in the present but in this very sentence, it occurs in the past.

Thus for the examples below, the omitted copular verb only acts and implies a connection between the subject and predicate. Due to the missing verbal inflections, only the suffixes that are attached to the nominal predicates can be used to determine such things as number and possession. As to what time the sentences are describing, it depends entirely on the context of when the sentences are being used and/ or the preceding and following sentences.

Ancient Greek

Ancient Greek	ἐμοὶ δ'ἄχος
Transliteration	emoì d'áchos
Literal translation	"and to me pain"
English translation	and to me there is pain

Latin

Latin	ūna salūs victīs
Literal translation	"one salvation for the conquered"
English translation	only one salvation remains for the conquered

Old Persian

Transliteration	manā pitā Vištāspa
Literal translation	"my father Vištāspa"
English translation	my father is Vištāspa

Tocharian A

Transliteration	tsraṣiñ waste wrasaśśi
Literal translation	"the strong the protection of the creatures"
English translation	the strong are the protection of the creatures

== See also ==
- Phrase
- Predicate (grammar)
- Zero copula

== Sources ==
- Carnie, Andrew (28 August 2012). Syntax: A Generative Introduction (3rd ed.). Chichester: Wiley-Blackwell. ISBN 978-0-470-65531-3.
- Mohammad, Mohammad A. (2000). Word Order, Agreement and Pronominalization in Standard and Palestinian Arabic. Amsterdam (i.a.): Benjamins. ISBN 90-272-3687-9.
- Fortson IV, Benjamin W. (2010). Indo-European Language and Culture: An Introduction (2nd ed.). Chichester: Wiley-Blackwell. ISBN 978-1-4051-8895-1.
