= Object complement =

In grammar, an object complement is a predicative expression that follows a direct object of an attributive ditransitive or resultative verb and that complements the direct object of the sentence by describing it. Object complements are constituents of the predicate. Noun phrases and adjective phrases most frequently function as object complements.

== Examples ==
The object complement is bold in the following examples:

- She painted the barn red. – Adjective as object complement

Here, painted is an attributive ditransitive verb. The direct object is the barn. The object complement construction allows for the combination of the sentences She painted the barn and The barn was painted red.

- He considers you a friend. – Noun phrase as object complement

Here, considers is an attributive ditransitive verb. The direct object is you. The object complement construction allows for the combination of the sentences He considers you and You are a friend.

== See also ==
- Direct object
- Complement (linguistics)
- Object (grammar)
- Predicate (grammar)
- Predicative expression
- Resultative
- Subject complement
