= List of English copulae =

This is a non-exhaustive list of copulae in the English language, i.e. words used to link the subject of a sentence with a predicate (a subject complement).

Because many of these copulative verbs may be used non-copulatively, examples are provided. Also, there can be other copulative verbs depending on the context and the meaning of the specific verb used. Therefore, this list is not an exhaustive one.

- act "Tom acted suspicious."
- appear "Tom appears satisfied, but really is not."
- be "Tom is a coward."
- become (inchoative) "Tom became wealthy."
- call in "Tom called in sick."
- come "The prediction came true;" "the belt came loose;" "the characters in the story come alive"
- come out "It came out burnt."
- constitute "Verbs constitute one of the main word classes in the English language"
- die "He died poor."
- emerge "Tom emerged unharmed after the incident."
- end up "I ended up broke;" "the room ended up a mess."
- equal "Two plus two equals four."
- get (inchoative) "Tom got angry."
- go "The man went crazy;" "Tom went bald;" "the food went bad;" "the mistake went unnoticed"
- grow (inchoative) "Tom grew insistent."
- fall "Tom fell ill with the flu."
- feel "Tom felt nauseated."
- freeze "The lake froze solid."
- keep "Tom kept quiet."
- lean "This area leans conservative."
- lie "Therein lies the paradox."
- look "Tom looks upset."
- play "The possum played dead."
- prove "Tom's behavior proves difficult to understand."
- remain "Tom remained unsatisfied."
- run "Protectionist impulses run far too strong on Capitol Hill" (New York Times)
- seem "Tom seems happy."
- shine "Her smile shines bright."
- smell "Tom smelled sweet"
- sound "Tom sounded obnoxious."
- stay "Tom stayed happy."
- take "Tom took ill."
- taste "The food tastes fresh."
- turn (inchoative) "Tom turned angry."
- turn up "Tom turned up missing."
- wax (inchoative) "Tom waxed lyrical."
