= Predicand =

Target of a description or assertion

In semantics, a predicand is an argument in an utterance, specifically that of which something is predicated. By extension, in syntax, it is the constituent in a clause typically functioning as the subject.

== Examples ==
In the most typical cases, the predicand corresponds to the subject of a clause, and the predicate corresponds to a verb phrase (VP) that is the head of the clause. But there are also form-meaning mismatches, where the predicand is not a subject or where the predicate is not the head of the clause. Also, not every utterance has a predicand.

=== When predicates correspond to the head of the clause ===
The typical case involves a predicand corresponding to the subject and a predicate corresponding to a verb phrase that is the head of the clause.

==== Subject predicands ====
Predicands are usually expressed in the utterance, and they are typically the subject. In the English example (1), the predicand is the person being spoken to, which corresponds to the subject you.

Do you want a coffee?
{} SUBJ {} {} {}

==== Unexpressed predicands ====
In many languages, pronominal subjects can be dropped, but this doesn't drop a predicand. For instance, in the Spanish example (2), there is no subject, but the predicand is still the person being spoken to.

¿Quieres un café?
want-2SG a coffee
"Do you want a coffee?"

If the subject is not included, the predicand can be ambiguous, as shown in the Japanese example (3).

あつい。
atsui
hot
"It's hot."

When (3) is spoken, it can be interpreted as "it's hot" where the predicand is the ambient temperature, or it can mean that an object is hot to the touch, in which case, the predicand would be the object in question.

Predicands are usually unexpressed in imperative clauses, but they are usually the person or people being addressed.

==== Non-subject predicands ====
There are cases in which the predicand has a syntactic function other than subject. This happens in raising constructions, such as (4).

What makes you think that?
{} {} OBJ {} {}

Here, you is the object of the make verb phrase, the head of the main clause. But it's also the predicand of the subordinate think clause, which has no subject.

Another example is in object predicands such as (5).

He made Kim happy
{} {} OBJ {}

=== Predicates other than head of the clause ===
==== Adjuncts with subject predicands ====
A modifier can be a predicate. Often this is a VP as in (6a), but it can also be an adjective phrase, as in (6b). In both cases the relevant modifier is underlined.

6a	Sitting next to her, I was happy.
b	I kept quiet, happy just to be there.

In both cases, the predicand is the speaker, which corresponds to the subject. Note that the predicand has two predicates in each case: the modifier and the head VP.

==== Adjuncts with unexpressed predicands ====
Like (2 & 3), adjunct can have unexpressed predicands. In (7), the underlined adjunct VP has no expressed predicand. The predicand in this case is the protagonist, Orlando. This kind of construction has traditionally been seen as a dangling modifier, though Donaldson argues otherwise.

7	Driving past Buckingham Palace last night, there was not a trace of that vast erection.
	(Orlando: A Biography)

==== Adjuncts with non-subject predicands ====
Similar to (4), adjuncts can take non-subject predicands. In (8), even though several things is the subject of the clause and John is the object of the preposition to, the underlined adjunct VP has John as its predicand.

8	Approaching the front of class, several things stood out to John.

In cleft sentences such as It's you who was right, the subject is the dummy pronoun it, but the predicand is the person being addressed, which corresponds to a complement in the VP. The predicate here is the VP in the relative clause modifier was right.

==== Verbless clauses ====
In verbless clauses, a predicate may be a constituent such as prepositional phrase. An example is shown in (9), with the predicate underlined.

9	My hands in my pockets, I waited.

Here, the predicand is the hands of the speaker, denoted by the subject of the verbless clause my hands in my pockets.

=== Utterances without a predicand ===
Utterances need not have a predicand. For example, an exclamation of Putain! in French after a painful bump has no predicand.

Impersonal verbs, such as rain in English or havazik "snow" in Hungarian also seem to have no predicand at all.

== Predicands and thematic roles ==
A predicand is typically a subject, and subjects typically have the thematic role of agent. Nevertheless, the predicand is by no means limited to this role.
