= Verbless clause =

Generative grammar

Verbless clauses are comprised, semantically, of a predicand, expressed or not, and a verbless predicate. For example, the underlined string in [With the children so sick,] we've been at home a lot means the same thing as the clause the children are so sick. It attributes the predicate "so sick" to the predicand "the children". In most contexts, *the children so sick would be ungrammatical.

== History of the concept ==
In the early days of generative grammar, new conceptions of the clause were emerging. Paul Postal and Noam Chomsky argued that every verb phrase had a subject, even if none was expressed, (though Joan Bresnan and Michael Brame disagreed). As a result, every VP was thought to head a clause.

The idea of verbless clauses was perhaps introduced by James McCawley in the early 1980s with examples like the underlined part of with John in jail... meaning "John is in jail".

== Examples ==
=== English ===
In Modern English, verbless clauses are common as the complement of with or without.

Other prepositions such as although, once, when, and while also take verbless clause complements, such as Although no longer a student, she still dreamed of the school, in which the predicand corresponds to the subject of the main clause, she. Supplements, too can be verbless clauses, as in Many people came, some of them children or Break over, they returned to work.

Neither A comprehensive grammar of the English language norThe Cambridge grammar of the English language offer any speculations about the structure(s) of such clauses. The latter says, without hedging, "the head of a clause (the predicate) is realised by a VP." It's not clear how such a statement could be compatible with the existence of verbless clauses.

Verbless clauses in English
Independent	Dependent
What a great thing to do! How odd that nobody noticed! Out of my way!	He stood there quietly, with his hands in his pockets. Whether a fact or not, it is commonly believed. Whatever the reason, it's annoying. He didn't love her as much as she him. The bramble shook as if alive.

=== Gurindji Kriol language ===
Ascriptive clauses consist of a subject noun and nominalised adjective.

ankaj dat karu im yapakayi-wn
poor.thing the child 3SG small-NMLZ
"Poor thing, that child is only a baby."

Existential clauses contain a subject with locative phrase.

dat warlaku im andanith jiya-ngka
the dog 3SG underneath chair-LOC
"The dog is underneath the chair."

Possessive constructions consist of a nominal acting as a predicate, taking another nominal argument. In these clauses the head is marked dative. Inalienable nominals (body parts and kinship) are only optionally marked dative.

wartarra yu bin kirt dat ngakparn-ku hawuj
hey 2SG PST break the frog-DAT house
"Hey you broke the frog's home (the bottle)."

=== Jingulu language ===
In Jingulu language, predicates in verbless clauses can be adjectives or nouns, possessors, adpositionals, or adverbs.

Verbless clause example:

Miringmi bardakurrumi.
gum good(v)
'Gum is good.'

=== Merei-Tiale language ===
In Merei-Tiale language, there are verbless equative clauses.

I	nau	motei	na	tasale
A:P	1	IRR.3.NEG	A:C	white-man
'I am not a white-man'

I	nie	motei	na	tija
A:P	3	IRR.3.NEG	A:C	teacher
'He is not a teacher'

=== Modern Scots ===
In Modern Scots, examples are seen in relative clauses. She haed tae walk the hale lenth o the road an her seiven month pregnant "She had to walk the whole length of the road—and she seven months pregnant". He telt me tae rin an me wi ma sair leg "He told me to run—and me with my sore leg".

=== Shilha language ===
Shilha language has examples like the following:

darnɣ argan ar inkkr ɣ tagant (with.us EL-argan it.is.growing in EA-forest) "we have an argan tree growing in the forest"
is ur dark kra yaḍnin? (question not with.you something other) "don't you have something different?"
