= Michael Brame =

American linguist known for recursive categorical syntax

Michael K. Brame (January 27, 1944 – August 16, 2010) was an American linguist. He served as a professor at the University of Washington and was the founding editor of the peer-reviewed research journal, Linguistic Analysis. Brame's work focused on the development of recursive categorical syntax, also referred to as algebraic syntax, which integrated principles from algebra and category theory to analyze sentence structure and linguistic relationships. His framework challenged conventional transformational grammar by advocating for a lexicon-centered approach and emphasizing the connections between words and phrases. Additionally, Brame collaborated with his wife on research investigating the identity of the author behind the name "William Shakespeare", resulting in several publications.

== Early life and education ==
Michael Brame was born on January 27, 1944, in San Antonio, Texas.

Brame started his study of linguistics at the University of Texas at Austin, receiving his BA in 1966. That summer he studied Egyptian Arabic at the American University of Cairo. That fall, Brame began a PhD program in linguistics at the Massachusetts Institute of Technology, studying under Morris Halle and Noam Chomsky, who was his adviser. He received his PhD in 1970 or 1971. His dissertation was titled Arabic Phonology: Implications for Phonological Theory and Historical Semitic.

Brame was a Fulbright scholar (Netherlands, 1973–1974).

== Recursive categorical syntax ==
Recursive Categorical Syntax (RCS), also known as algebraic syntax, is a linguistic framework that integrates concepts from algebra and category theory to model sentence structure and linguistic relationships. It is a type of dependency grammar, and is related to link grammars. It views words and phrases as mathematical entities, employing algebraic operations to depict their combinations within sentences. Brame's view that "transformations simply do not exist" challenges transformational-generative grammar, advocating for a lexicon-centered perspective.

By formalizing word connections, algebraic syntax aims to better understand syntax and simplify traditional theories of grammar, stressing the recursive nature of language and the hierarchical arrangement of linguistic elements, as reflected in Brame's assertions that "the lexicon must be elaborated" and "deep structure falls along with the classical transformations once the lexicon is taken seriously." This approach is intended to provide a comprehensive and mathematical grasp of sentence formation and linguistic structure.

As Brame emphasized, this approach relies on a non-associative groupoid structure with inverses to represent the interactions of lexical items (words and phrases), or lexes for short. A LEX is a lexicon containing string representations of a word or idiomatic phrase together with a notation specifying what other classes of word or phrase can bond with the string.

== Shakespeare's Fingerprints ==
In 2002, Brame co-authored with his wife Galina Popova a book titled Shakespeare's Fingerprints. Over the next two years, they published three more books on the topic.

== Personal life ==
Brame was married to Galina Popova.

== See also ==
- Lambek calculus

== Bibliography ==
=== Dissertation ===
- Brame, M. K. (1970). Arabic phonology: implications for phonological theory and historical Semitic (PDF) (Doctoral dissertation). Massachusetts Institute of Technology.

=== Books ===
- Brame, Michael K. (1976). Conjectures and Refutations in Syntax and Semantics. North Holland: Elsevier Science. ISBN 978-0444001856.
- Brame, Michael K. (1978). Base Generated Syntax. Linguistics research monograph series. Vol. 1. Seattle: Noit Amrofer Publishing Company. ISBN 978-0932998002.
- Brame, Michael K. (1979). Essays Toward Realistic Syntax. Linguistics research monograph series. Vol. 2. Seattle: Noit Amrofer Publishing Company. ISBN 978-0932998019.

On Shakespeare

- Brame, Michael K.; Popova, Galina (2002). Shakespeare's Fingerprints. Adonis Editions. ISBN 978-0972038508.
- Brame, Michael K.; Popova, Galina (2003). Never and Forever. Adonis Editions. ISBN 978-0972038553.
- Brame, Michael K.; Popova, Galina, eds. (2004). Secret Shakespeare's Adventures of Freeman Jones. Adonis Editions. ISBN 978-0972038515.
- Brame, Michael K.; Popova, Galina, eds. (2004b). What Thing Is Love?. Adonis Editions. ISBN 978-0972038560.

=== Selected articles ===
- Baker, C. L.; Brame, M. K. (March 1972). "'Global rules': a rejoinder". Language. 48 (1): 51–75. doi:10.2307/412490. JSTOR 412490.
- Brame, M. K. (1974). "The cycle in phonology: stress in Palestinian, Maltese, and Spanish". Linguistic Inquiry. 5 (1): 39–60. JSTOR 4177807.
- Hust, J. R.; Brame, M. K. (1976). "Jackendoff on interpretive semantics-Review of Semantic Interpretation in Generative Grammar by Jackendoff, R.". Linguistic Analysis. 2 (3): 243–277.
- Brame, M. K. (1977). "Alternatives to the Tensed S and specified subject conditions". Linguistics and Philosophy. 1 (3): 381–411. doi:10.1007/BF00353455. S2CID 62609527.
- Brame, M. (1981). "Trace Theory with Filters vs. Lexically Based Syntax Without". Linguistic Inquiry. 12 (2): 275–293. JSTOR 4178219.
- Brame, M. (1981). "The general theory of binding and fusion". Linguistic Analysis. 7 (3). Seattle: 277–325.
- Brame, M. (1982). "The head-selector theory of lexical specifications and the nonexistence of coarse categories". Linguistic Analysis. 10 (4). Seattle: 321–325.

Recursive categorical syntax

- Brame, M. (1984). "Universal Word Induction vs Move α". Linguistic Analysis. 14 (4). Seattle: 313–352.
- Brame, M. (1984). "Recursive categorical syntax and morphology". Linguistic Analysis. 14 (4). Seattle: 265–287.
- Brame, M. (1985). "Recursive Categorical Syntax II: n-arity and Variable Continuation". Linguistic Analysis. 15 (2–3). Seattle: 137–176.
- Brame, M. (1987). "Recursive Categorical Syntax III: d-Words, l-Words, and dl-Induction". Linguistic Analysis. 17 (3–4). Seattle: 147–185.

== See also ==
- Category theory – General theory of mathematical structures
- English clause syntax – Clauses in English grammar
- Generative semantics – Research program in theoretical linguistics
- Phrase structure grammar – Type of grammar based on constituent entities
- Verbless clause – Generative grammar
