= Compliment =

A compliment is an expression of praise, congratulation or encouragement.

Compliment or Compliments may refer to:

== Music ==
- "Compliments" (Band of Horses song)
- "Compliments" (Bloc Party song)
- Garcia, an album by Jerry Garcia that is also known as Compliments

== Other uses ==
- Backhanded compliment, an insult disguised as a compliment
- Compliment, a formalized respectful action paid to a superior, such as saluting an officer in the armed forces
- Compliments slip, a small acknowledgement note, less formal than a letter
- Compliment, a typeface by Ludwig & Mayer

== See also ==
- Complement (disambiguation)
- Complimentary (disambiguation)
