= Copula (linguistics) =

Functional part of speech in most languages

In linguistics, a copula (/ˈkɒpjələ/; pl.: copulas or copulae; abbreviated cop) is a word or phrase that links the subject of a sentence to a subject complement, such as the word is in the sentence "The sky is blue" or the phrase was not being in the sentence "It was not being cooperative." The word copula derives from the Latin noun for a 'link' or 'tie' that connects two different things.

A copula is often a verb or a verb-like word, though this is not universally the case. A verb that is a copula is sometimes called a copulative or copular verb. In English primary education grammar courses, a copula is often called a linking verb. In other languages, copulas show more resemblances to pronouns, as in Classical Chinese and Guarani, or may take the form of suffixes attached to a noun, as in Korean, Beja, and Inuit languages.

Most languages have one main copula (in English, the verb "to be"), although some (such as Spanish, Portuguese and Thai) have more than one, while others have none. While the term copula is generally used to refer to such principal verbs, it may also be used for a wider group of verbs with similar potential functions (such as become, get, feel and seem in English); alternatively, these might be distinguished as "semi-copulas" or "pseudo-copulas".

== Grammatical function ==
The principal use of a copula is to link the subject of a clause to a subject complement. A copular verb is often considered to be part of the predicate, the remainder being called a predicative expression. A simple clause containing a copula is illustrated below:

The book is on the table.

In that sentence, the noun phrase the book is the subject, the verb is serves as the copula, and the prepositional phrase on the table is the predicative expression. In some theories of grammar, the whole expression is on the table may be called a predicate or a verb phrase.

The predicative expression accompanying the copula, also known as the complement of the copula, may take any of several possible forms: it may be a noun or noun phrase, an adjective or adjective phrase, a prepositional phrase (as above), or an adverb or another adverbial phrase expressing time or location. Examples are given below, with the copula in bold and the predicative expression in italics:

Mary and John are my friends.
The sky was blue.
I am taller than most people.
The birds and the beasts were there.

The three components (subject, copula and predicative expression) do not necessarily appear in that order: their positioning depends on the rules for word order applicable to the language in question. In English (an SVO language), the ordering given above is the normal one, but certain variation is possible:

- In many questions and other clauses with subject–auxiliary inversion, the copula moves in front of the subject: **Are you** happy?
- In inverse copular constructions (see below) the predicative expression precedes the copula, but the subject follows it: In the room were three men.

It is also possible, in certain circumstances, for one (or even two) of the three components to be absent:

- In null-subject (pro-drop) languages, the subject may be omitted, as it may from other types of sentence. In Italian, sono stanco means 'I am tired', literally 'am tired'.
- In non-finite clauses in languages such as English, the subject is often absent, as in the participial phrase being tired or the infinitive phrase to be tired. The same applies to most imperative sentences such as Be good!
- For cases in which no copula appears, see § Zero copula below.
- Any of the three components may be omitted as a result of various general types of ellipsis. In particular, in English, the predicative expression may be elided in a construction similar to verb phrase ellipsis, as in short sentences such as I am; Are they? (where the predicative expression is understood from the previous context).

Inverse copular constructions, in which the positions of the predicative expression and the subject are reversed, are found in various languages. They have been the subject of much theoretical analysis, particularly in regard to the difficulty of maintaining, in the case of such sentences, the usual division into a subject noun phrase and a predicate verb phrase.

Another issue is verb agreement when both subject and predicative expression are noun phrases (and differ in number or person): in English, the copula typically agrees with the syntactical subject even if it is not logically (i.e. semantically) the subject, as in the cause of the riot is (not are) these pictures of the wall. Compare Italian la causa della rivolta sono queste foto del muro; notice the use of the plural sono to agree with plural queste foto 'these photos' rather than with singular la causa 'the cause'. In instances where an English syntactical subject comprises a prepositional object that is pluralized, however, the prepositional object agrees with the predicative expression, e.g. "What kind of birds are those?"

The definition and scope of the concept of a copula is not necessarily precise in any language. As noted above, though the concept of the copula in English is most strongly associated with the verb to be, there are many other verbs that can be used in a copular sense as well.

- The boy **became** a man.
- The girl **grew** more excited as the holiday preparations intensified.
- The dog **felt** tired from the activity.

And more tenuously

- The milk **turned** sour.
- The food **smells** good.
- You **seem** upset.

=== Other functions ===
A copular verb may also have other uses supplementary to or distinct from its uses as a copula. Some co-occurrences are common.

==== Auxiliary verb ====
The English verb to be is also used as an auxiliary verb, especially for expressing passive voice (together with the past participle) or expressing progressive aspect (together with the present participle):

The man was killed. (passive)
It is raining. (progressive)

Other languages' copulas have additional uses as auxiliaries. For example, French être can be used to express passive voice similarly to English be; both French être and German sein are used to express the perfect forms of certain verbs:

Je suis allé(e) French for 'I went' and 'I have gone', literally 'I am gone', but does not imply still being gone.

In the same way, usage of English be in the present perfect, though archaic, is still commonly seen in old texts/translations:

I am become death.
He is risen.

The auxiliary functions of these verbs derived from their copular function, and could be interpreted as special cases of the copular function (with the verbal forms it precedes being considered adjectival).

Another auxiliary usage in English is to denote an obligatory action or expected occurrence: "I am to serve you". "The manager is to resign". This can be put also into past tense: "We were to leave at 9". For forms such as "if I was/were to come", see English conditional sentences. (By certain criteria, the English copula be may always be considered an auxiliary verb; see Diagnostics for identifying auxiliary verbs in English.)

==== Existential verb ====
The English to be and its equivalents in certain other languages also have a non-copular use as an existential verb, meaning "to exist". This use is illustrated in the following sentences: I want only to be, and that is enough; I think therefore I am; To be or not to be, that is the question. In these cases, the verb itself expresses a predicate (that of existence), rather than linking to a predicative expression as it does when used as a copula. In ontology it is sometimes suggested that the "is" of existence is reducible to the "is" of property attribution or class membership; to be, Aristotle held, is to be something. However, Abelard in his Dialectica made a reductio ad absurdum argument against the idea that the copula can express existence.

Similar examples can be found in many other languages; for example, the French and Latin equivalents of I think therefore I am are Je pense, donc je suis and Cogito ergo sum, where suis and sum are the equivalents of English "am", normally used as copulas. However, other languages prefer a different verb for existential use, as in the Spanish version Pienso, luego existo (where the verb existir 'to exist' is used rather than the copula ser or estar 'to be').

Another type of existential usage is in clauses of the there is... or there are... type. Languages differ in the way they express such meanings; some of them use the copular verb, possibly with an expletive pronoun such as the English there, while other languages use different verbs and constructions, such as the French il y a (which uses parts of the verb avoir 'to have', not the copula) or the Swedish finns (the passive voice of the verb for "to find"). For details, see existential clause.

Relying on a unified theory of copular sentences, it has been proposed that the English there-sentences are subtypes of inverse copular constructions.

== Meanings ==
Predicates formed using a copula may express identity: asserting that two noun phrases (subject and complement) have the same referent or express an identical concept:

I want only to be myself.
The Morning Star is the Evening Star.

They may also express membership of a class or a subset relationship:

She was a nurse.
Cats are carnivorous mammals.

Similarly they may express some property, relation or position, permanent or temporary:

The trees are green.
I am your boss.
The hen is next to the cockerel.
The children are confused.

The use of copulas, especially in some of their functions, can evoke opposition. E-Prime eschews excessive copula-usage in the interests of (for example) clarity. Deleuze and Guattari object to some implications of the verb "to be":

The tree imposes the verb 'to be,' but the fabric of the rhizome is the conjunction, 'and... and... and...' This conjunction carries enough force to shake and uproot the verb 'to be.' Where are you going? Where are you coming from? What are you heading for? These are totally useless questions. Making a clean slate, starting or beginning again from ground zero, seeking a beginning or a foundation — all imply a false conception of voyage and movement (a conception that is methodical, pedagogical, initiatory, symbolic...).

=== Essence versus state ===
Some languages use different copulas, or different syntax, to denote a permanent, essential characteristic of something versus a temporary state. For examples, see the sections on the Romance languages, Slavic languages and Irish.

== Forms ==
In many languages the principal copula is a verb, such as English (to) be, German sein, Mixtec kuu, Touareg emous, etc. It may inflect for grammatical categories such as tense, aspect and mood, like other verbs in the language. Being a very commonly used verb, it is likely that the copula has irregular inflected forms; in English, the verb be has a number of highly irregular (suppletive) forms and has more different inflected forms than any other English verb (am, is, are, was, were, etc.; see English verbs for details).

Other copulas show more resemblances to pronouns. That is the case for Classical Chinese and Guarani, for instance. In highly synthetic languages, copulas are often suffixes, attached to a noun, but they may still behave otherwise like ordinary verbs: -u- in Inuit languages.

In some other languages, such as Beja and Ket, the copula takes the form of suffixes that attach to a noun but are distinct from the person agreement markers used on predicative verbs. This phenomenon is known as nonverbal person agreement (or nonverbal subject agreement), and the relevant markers are always established as deriving from cliticized independent pronouns.

=== Zero copula ===
In some languages, copula omission occurs within a particular grammatical context. For example, speakers of Bengali, Russian, Indonesian, Turkish, Hungarian, Arabic, Hebrew, Geʽez and Quechuan languages consistently drop the copula in present tense: Bengali: আমি মানুষ, Aami manush, 'I (am a) human'; Russian: я человек, ya chelovek 'I (am a) human'; Indonesian: saya seorang manusia 'I (am) a human'; Turkish: o insan 's/he (is a) human'; Hungarian: ő ember 's/he (is) a human'; Arabic: أنا إنسان, ʾana ʾinsān 'I (am a) human'; Hebrew: אני אדם, ʔani ʔadam 'I (am a) human'; Geʽez: አነ ብእሲ/ብእሲ አነ, ʔana bəʔəsi / bəʔəsi ʔana 'I (am a) man' / '(a) man I (am)'; Southern Quechua: payqa runam 's/he (is) a human'. The usage is known generically as the zero copula. In other tenses (sometimes in forms other than third person singular), the copula usually reappears.

Some languages drop the copula in poetic or aphoristic contexts. Examples in English include

- The more, the merrier.
- Out of many, one.
- True that.

Such poetic copula dropping is more pronounced in some languages other than English, such as the Romance languages.

In informal speech of English, the copula may also be dropped in general sentences, as in "She a nurse" or "They not like us." It is a feature of African-American Vernacular English, but is also used by a variety of other English speakers.

==== Examples in specific languages ====
In Ancient Greek, when an adjective precedes a noun with an article, the copula is understood: ὁ οἴκος ἐστὶ μακρός, "the house is large", can be written μακρός ὁ οἴκος, "large the house (is)."

In Quechua (Southern Quechua used for the examples), zero copula is restricted to present tense in third person singular (kan): Payqa runam '(s)he is a human'; but: (paykuna) runakunam kanku '(they) are human'.

In Māori, the zero copula can be used in predicative expressions and with continuous verbs (many of which take a copulative verb in many Indo-European languages) — He nui te whare, literally 'a big the house', 'the house (is) big'; I te tēpu te pukapuka, literally 'at (past locative particle) the table the book', 'the book (was) on the table'; Nō Ingarangi ia, literally 'from England (s)he', '(s)he (is) from England', Kei te kai au, literally 'at the (act of) eating I', 'I (am) eating'.

Alternatively, in many cases, the particle ko can be used as a copulative (though not all instances of ko are used as thus, like all other Māori particles, ko has multiple purposes): Ko nui te whare 'The house is big'; Ko te pukapuka kei te tēpu 'It is the book (that is) on the table'; Ko au kei te kai 'It is me eating'.

However, when expressing identity or class membership, ko must be used: Ko tēnei tāku pukapuka 'This is my book'; Ko Ōtautahi he tāone i Te Waipounamu 'Christchurch is a city in the South Island (of New Zealand)'; Ko koe tōku hoa 'You are my friend'.

When expressing identity, ko can be placed on either object in the clause without changing the meaning (ko tēnei tāku pukapuka is the same as ko tāku pukapuka tēnei) but not on both (ko tēnei ko tāku pukapuka would be equivalent to saying "it is this, it is my book" in English).

In Hungarian, zero copula is restricted to present tense in third person singular and plural: Ő ember/Ők emberek — 's/he is a human' / 'they are humans'; but: (én) ember vagyok 'I am a human', (te) ember vagy 'you are a human', mi emberek vagyunk 'we are humans', (ti) emberek vagytok 'you (all) are humans'. The copula also reappears for stating locations: az emberek a házban vannak 'the people are in the house', and for stating time: hat óra van 'it is six o'clock'. However, the copula may be omitted in colloquial language: hat óra (van) 'it is six o'clock'.

Hungarian uses copula lenni for expressing location: Itt van Róbert 'Bob is here', but it is omitted in the third person present tense for attribution or identity statements: Róbert öreg 'Bob is old'; ők éhesek 'they are hungry'; Kati nyelvtudós 'Cathy is a linguist' (but Róbert öreg volt 'Bob was old', éhesek voltak 'they were hungry', Kati nyelvtudós volt 'Cathy was a linguist').

In Turkish, both the third person singular and the third person plural copulas are omittable. Ali burada and Ali buradadır both mean 'Ali is here', and Onlar aç and Onlar açlar both mean 'They are hungry'. Both of the sentences are acceptable and grammatically correct, but sentences with the copula are more formal.

The Turkish first person singular copula suffix is omitted when introducing oneself. Bora ben 'I am Bora' is grammatically correct, but Bora benim (same sentence with the copula) is not for an introduction (but is grammatically correct in other cases).

Further restrictions may apply before omission is permitted. For example, in the Irish language, is, the present tense of the copula, may be omitted when the predicate is a noun. Ba, the past/conditional, cannot be deleted. If the present copula is omitted, the pronoun (e.g., é, í, iad) preceding the noun is omitted as well.

== Copula-like words ==
Sometimes, the term copula is taken to include not only a language's equivalent(s) to the verb be but also other verbs or forms that serve to link a subject to a predicative expression (while adding semantic content of their own). For example, English verbs such as become, get, feel, look, taste, smell, and seem can have this function, as in the following sentences (the predicative expression, the complement of the verb, is in italics):

She became a student.
They look tired.
The milk tastes bad.
That bread smells good.
I feel bad that she can't come with us.
London stands (is) on the river Thames.
How is Mary?; She seems (is) well (fine).

(This usage should be distinguished from the use of some of these verbs as "action" verbs, as in They look at the wall, in which look denotes an action and cannot be replaced by the basic copula are.)

Some verbs have rarer, secondary uses as copular verbs, such as the verb fall in sentences such as The zebra fell victim to the lion.

These extra copulas are sometimes called "semi-copulas" or "pseudo-copulas." For a list of common verbs of this type in English, see List of English copulae.

== In particular languages ==
=== Indo-European ===
In Indo-European languages, the words meaning to be are sometimes similar to each other. Due to the high frequency of their use, their inflection retains a considerable degree of similarity in some cases. Thus, for example, the English form is is a cognate of German ist, Latin est, Persian ast and Russian jest', even though the Germanic, Italic, Iranian and Slavic language groups split at least 3000 years ago. The origins of the copulas of most Indo-European languages can be traced back to four Proto-Indo-European stems: *es- (*h_{1}es-), *sta- (*steh_{2}-), *wes- and *bhu- (*bʰuH-).

==== English ====
The English copular verb be has eight basic forms (be, am, is, are, being, was, were, been) and five negative forms (ain't in some dialects, isn't, aren't, wasn't, weren't). No other English verb has more than five forms. Additional archaic forms include art, wast, wert, and occasionally beest (as a subjunctive). The possibility of copula omission is mentioned under § Zero copula.

A particular construction found in English (particularly in speech) is the use of two successive copulas when only one appears necessary, as in My point is, is that.... The acceptability of this construction is a disputed matter in English prescriptive grammar.

The simple English copula be may on occasion be substituted by other verbs with near identical meanings.

==== Pashto ====
In Pashto, the verb ول (wal) functions as the copula like the verb "to be" in English, linking the subject of a sentence to a predicate, such as a noun or adjective. The copula is inflected for person and number, and in the third person also for gender; in the first and second person, it does not change for gender.

In the past tense, the copula systematically changes the consonant "Y" to "W", e.g., present yam → past wam. The future tense is formed by placing the particle "Ba" after the subject and before the present form of the copula. In the third person, "Ba" precedes "Yi" rather than the usual present forms de/da/di.

The past habitual tense in Pashto also uses the particle "Ba" with the copula. Unlike the future tense, in which "Ba" follows the present form of the copula, in the past habitual tense "Ba" is followed by the past form of the copula corresponding to the subject e.g., Za Ba Wam ( I used to be), indicating repeated or customary actions in the past.

==== Persian ====
In Persian, the verb to be can take the form of either ast (cognate to English is) or budan (cognate to be).

Aseman abi ast.	آسمان آبی است	'The sky is blue.'
Aseman abi khahad bood.	آسمان آبی خواهد بود	'The sky will be blue.'
Aseman abi bood.	آسمان آبی بود	'The sky was blue.'

==== Hindustani ====
In Hindustani (Hindi and Urdu), the copula होना honā ہونا can be put into four grammatical aspects (simple, habitual, perfective, and progressive) and each of those four aspects can be put into five grammatical moods (indicative, presumptive, subjunctive, contrafactual, and imperative). Some example sentences using the simple aspect are shown below:

		Hindi	Urdu	Transliteration	English
Simple Indicative	Present	आसमान नीला है।	آسمان نیلا ہے	āsmān nīla hai.	'the sky is blue.'
Simple Indicative	Perfect	आसमान नीला हुआ।	آسمان نیلا ہوا	āsmān nīla huā.	'the sky became blue.'
Simple Indicative	Imperfect	आसमान नीला था।	آسمان نیلا تھا	āsmān nīla thā.	'the sky was blue.'
Simple Indicative	Future	आसमान नीला होएगा।	آسمان نیلا ہوگا	āsmān nīla hoegā.	'the sky will be blue.'
Simple Subjunctive	Present	आसमान नीला हो।	آسمان نیلا ہو	āsmān nīla ho.	'the sky be blue.'
Simple Subjunctive	Future	आसमान नीला होए।	آسمان نیلا ہوے	āsmān nīla hoe.	'the sky becomes blue.'
Simple Presumptive Present		आसमान नीला होगा।	آسمان نیلا ہوگا	āsmān nīlā hogā.	'the sky might be blue.'
Simple Contrafactual Past		आसमान नीला होता।	آسمان نیلا ہوتا	āsmān nīla hotā.	'the sky would have been blue.'

Besides the verb होना honā ہونا 'to be', there are three other verbs which can also be used as the copula: रहना rêhnā رہنا 'to stay', जाना jānā جانا 'to go', and आना ānā آنا 'to come'. The following table shows the conjugations of the copula होना honā ہونا in the five grammatical moods in the simple aspect. The transliteration scheme used is ISO 15919.

Hindustani Copula होना ہونا 'to be' [Simple Aspect]
Mood	Tense	Gender	Pronouns			
Mood	Tense	Gender	ma͠i	tū	tum	āp, ham
Indicative	Present	♂ ♀	hū̃	hai	ho	ha͠i
Indicative	Perfect	♂	huā		hue	
Indicative	Perfect	♀	huī			huī̃
Indicative	Imperfect	♂	thā		the	
Indicative	Imperfect	♀	thī			thī̃
Indicative	Future	♂	hoū̃gā	hoegā	hooge	hoẽge
Indicative	Future	♀	hoū̃gī	hoegī	hoogī	hoẽgī
Presumptive	All	♂	hū̃gā	hogā	hoge	hõge
Presumptive	All	♀	hū̃gī	hogī	hogī	hõgī
Subjunctive	Present	♂ ♀	hū̃	ho		hõ
Subjunctive	Future	♂ ♀	hoū̃	hoe	hoo	hoẽ
Contrafactual	Past	♂	hotā		hote	
Contrafactual	Past	♀	hotī			hotī̃
Imperative	Present	♂ ♀	—	ho	hoo	hoiye
Imperative	Future	♂ ♀	—	hoiyo	honā	hoiyegā
Note: the third person singular and plural conjugations are respectively the same as the second person intimate and formal conjugations.

==== Romance ====
Copulas in the Romance languages usually consist of two different verbs that can be translated as "to be", the main one from the Latin esse (via Vulgar Latin essere; esse deriving from *es-), often referenced as sum (another of the Latin verb's principal parts) and a secondary one from stare (from *sta-), often referenced as stō. The resulting distinction in the modern forms is found in all the Iberian Romance languages, and to a lesser extent Italian but only with adverbs like "bene" and "male", but not in French or Romanian. The difference is that the first usually refers to essential characteristics, while the second refers to states and situations, e.g., "Bob is old" versus "Bob is well." A similar division is found in the non-Romance Basque language (viz. egon and izan). (The English words just used, "essential" and "state", are also cognate with the Latin infinitives esse and stare. The word "stay" also comes from Latin stare, through Middle French estai, stem of Old French ester.) In Spanish and Portuguese, the high degree of verbal inflection, plus the existence of two copulas (ser and estar), means that there are 105 (Spanish) and 110 (Portuguese) separate forms to express the copula, compared to eight in English and one in Chinese.

Copula	Language			
Copula	Italian	Spanish	Portuguese	English
Sum-derived	Bob è vecchio.	Bob es viejo.	Bob é velho.	'Bob is old.'
Sto-derived	Bob sta bene.	Bob está bien.	Bob está bem	'Bob is well.'

In some cases, the verb itself changes the meaning of the adjective/sentence. The following examples are from Portuguese:

Copula	Example 1			Example 2		
Copula	Portuguese	Spanish	English	Portuguese	Spanish	English
Sum-derived	Bob é esquisito.	Bob es raro.	'Bob is weird.'	Bob é parvo.	Bob es tonto.	'Bob is foolish.'
Sto-derived	Bob está esquisito.	Bob está raro.	'Bob is looking/being strange.'	Bob está parvo.	Bob está tonto.	'Bob is acting/being silly.'

==== Slavic ====
Some Slavic languages make a distinction between essence and state (similar to that discussed in the above section on the Romance languages), by putting a predicative expression denoting a state into the instrumental case, and essential characteristics are in the nominative. This can apply with other copula verbs as well: the verbs for "become" are normally used with the instrumental case.

As noted above under § Zero copula, Russian and other North Slavic languages generally or often omit the copula in the present tense.

==== Irish ====
In Irish and Scottish Gaelic, there are two copulas, and the syntax is also changed when one is distinguishing between states or situations and essential characteristics.

Describing the subject's state or situation typically uses the normal VSO ordering with the verb bí. The copula is is used to state essential characteristics or equivalences.

Is fear é Liam.	'Liam is a man.'	(lit. 'Is man Liam.')
Is leabhar é sin.	'That is a book.'	(lit. 'Is book it that.')

The word is is the copula (rhymes with the English word "miss").

The pronoun used with the copula is different from the normal pronoun. For a masculine singular noun, é is used (for "he" or "it"), as opposed to the normal pronoun sé; for a feminine singular noun, í is used (for "she" or "it"), as opposed to normal pronoun sí; for plural nouns, iad is used (for "they" or "those"), as opposed to the normal pronoun siad.

To describe being in a state, condition, place, or act, the verb "to be" is used: Tá mé ag rith. 'I am running.'

=== Arabic dialects ===
==== North Levantine Arabic ====
The North Levantine Arabic dialect, spoken in Syria and Lebanon, has a negative copula formed by ما mā / ma and a suffixed pronoun.

Negative copula in Levantine
		Singular	Plural
1st person (m/f)		مانّي māni	مانّا māna
2nd person	m	مانَّك mānak	مانكُن mānkon
2nd person	f	مانِّك mānek	مانكُن mānkon
3rd person	m	مانّو māno	مانُّن mānon
3rd person	f	مانّا māna	مانُّن mānon

=== Bantu languages ===
==== Chichewa ====
In Chichewa, a Bantu language spoken mainly in Malawi, a very similar distinction exists between permanent and temporary states as in Spanish and Portuguese, but only in the present tense. For a permanent state, in the 3rd person, the copula used in the present tense is ndi (negative sí):

iyé ndi mphunzitsi 'he is a teacher'
iyé sí mphunzitsi 'he is not a teacher'

For the 1st and 2nd persons the particle ndi is combined with pronouns, e.g., ine 'I':

ine ndine mphunzitsi 'I am a teacher'
iwe ndiwe mphunzitsi 'you (sg.) are a teacher'
ine síndine mphunzitsi 'I am not a teacher'

For temporary states and location, the copula is the appropriate form of the defective verb -li:

iyé ali bwino 'he is well'
iyé sáli bwino 'he is not well'
iyé ali ku nyumbá 'he is in the house'

For the 1st and 2nd persons the person is shown, as normally with Chichewa verbs, by the appropriate pronominal prefix:

ine ndili bwino 'I am well'
iwe uli bwino 'you (sg.) are well'
kunyumbá kuli bwino 'at home (everything) is fine'

In the past tenses, -li is used for both types of copula:

iyé analí bwino 'he was well (this morning)'
iyé ánaalí mphunzitsi 'he was a teacher (at that time)'

In the future, subjunctive, or conditional tenses, a form of the verb khala 'sit/dwell' is used as a copula:

máwa ákhala bwino 'he'll be fine tomorrow'

=== Muylaq' Aymaran ===
Uniquely, the existence of the copulative verbalizer suffix in the Southern Peruvian Aymaran language variety, Muylaq' Aymara, is evident only in the surfacing of a vowel that would otherwise have been deleted because of the presence of a following suffix, lexically prespecified to suppress it. As the copulative verbalizer has no independent phonetic structure, it is represented by the Greek letter ʋ in the examples used in this entry.

Accordingly, unlike in most other Aymaran variants, whose copulative verbalizer is expressed with a vowel-lengthening component, -:, the presence of the copulative verbalizer in Muylaq' Aymara is often not apparent on the surface at all and is analyzed as existing only meta-linguistically. However, in a verb phrase such as "It is old", the noun thantha 'old' does not require the copulative verbalizer: thantha-wa 'It is old'.

It is now pertinent to make some observations about the distribution of the copulative verbalizer. The best place to start is with words in which its presence or absence is obvious. When the vowel-suppressing first person simple tense suffix attaches to a verb, the vowel of the immediately preceding suffix is suppressed (in the examples in this subsection, the subscript "c" appears prior to vowel-suppressing suffixes in the interlinear gloss to better distinguish instances of deletion that arise from the presence of a lexically pre-specified suffix from those that arise from other (e.g. phonotactic) motivations). Consider the verb sara-, which is inflected for the first person simple tense and so, predictably, loses its final root vowel: sar(a)-_{c}t-wa 'I go'.

However, prior to the suffixation of the first person simple suffix -_{c}t to the same root nominalized with the agentive nominalizer -iri, the word must be verbalized. The fact that the final vowel of -iri below is not suppressed indicates the presence of an intervening segment, the copulative verbalizer: sar(a)-iri-ʋ-t-wa 'I usually go'.

It is worthwhile to compare of the copulative verbalizer in Muylaq' Aymara as compared to La Paz Aymara, a variant which represents this suffix with vowel lengthening. Consider the near-identical sentences below, both translations of "I have a small house" in which the nominal root uta-ni 'house-attributive' is verbalized with the copulative verbalizer, but the correspondence between the copulative verbalizer in these two variants is not always a strict one-to-one relation.

La Paz Aymara:	ma: jisk'a uta-ni-:-_{c}t(a)-wa
Muylaq' Aymara:	ma isk'a uta-ni-ʋ-_{c}t-wa

=== Georgian ===
As in English, the verb "to be" (qopna) is irregular in Georgian (a Kartvelian language); different verb roots are employed in different tenses. The roots -ar-, -kn-, -qav-, and -qop- (past participle) are used in the present tense, future tense, past tense and the perfective tenses respectively. Examples:

Masc'avlebeli var.	'I am a teacher.'
Masc'avlebeli viknebi.	'I will be a teacher.'
Masc'avlebeli viqavi.	'I was a teacher.'
Masc'avlebeli vqopilvar.	'I have been a teacher.'
Masc'avlebeli vqopiliqavi.	'I had been a teacher.'

In the last two examples (perfective and pluperfect), two roots are used in one verb compound. In the perfective tense, the root qop (which is the expected root for the perfective tense) is followed by the root ar, which is the root for the present tense. In the pluperfective tense, again, the root qop is followed by the past tense root qav. This formation is very similar to German (an Indo-European language), where the perfect and the pluperfect are expressed in the following way:

Ich bin Lehrer gewesen.	'I have been a teacher', literally 'I am teacher been.'
Ich war Lehrer gewesen.	'I had been a teacher', literally 'I was teacher been.'

Here, gewesen is the past participle of sein 'to be' in German. In both examples, as in Georgian, this participle is used together with the present and the past forms of the verb in order to conjugate for the perfect and the pluperfect aspects.

=== Haitian Creole ===
Haitian Creole, a French-based creole language, has three forms of the copula: se, ye, and the zero copula, no word at all (the position of which will be indicated with Ø, just for purposes of illustration).

Although no textual record exists of Haitian-Creole at its earliest stages of development from French, se is derived from French [se] (written c'est), which is the normal French contraction of [sə] (that, written ce) and the copula [e] (is, written est) (a form of the verb être).

The derivation of ye is less obvious; but we can assume that the French source was [ile] ("he/it is", written il est), which, in rapidly spoken French, is very commonly pronounced as [je] (typically written y est).

The use of a zero copula is unknown in French, and it is thought to be an innovation from the early days when Haitian-Creole was first developing as a Romance-based pidgin. Latin also sometimes used a zero copula.

Which of se/ye/Ø is used in any given copula clause depends on complex syntactic factors that we can superficially summarize in the following four rules:

1. Use Ø (i.e., no word at all) in declarative sentences where the complement is an adjective phrase, prepositional phrase, or adverb phrase:

Li te Ø an Ayiti.
she PAST COP in Haiti.
"She was in Haiti."

Liv-la Ø jon.
book-the COP yellow.
"The book is yellow."

Timoun-yo Ø lakay.
Kids-the COP home.
"The kids are [at] home."

2. Use se when the complement is a noun phrase. But, whereas other verbs come after any tense/mood/aspect particles (such as pa to mark negation, or te to explicitly mark past tense, or ap to mark progressive aspect), se comes before any such particles:

Chal se ekriven.
Charles is writer.
"Charles is a writer."

Chal, ki se ekriven, pa vini.
Charles, who is writer, not come.

3. Use se where French and English have a dummy "it" subject:

Se mwen!
C'est moi!
"It's me!"

Se pa fasil.
C'est pas facile.
"It's not easy"

4. Finally, use the other copula form ye in situations where the sentence's syntax leaves the copula at the end of a phrase:

Kijan ou ye?
how 2SG be?
"How you are?"

Pou kimoun liv-la te ye?
Of who book-the PAST be?
"Whose book was it?"

M pa konnen kimoun li ye.
I not know who he is.
"I don't know who he is."

Se yon ekriven Chal ye.
C'est un écrivain Charles est.
Be a writer Charles be.
"Charles is a writer!"

The above is, however, only a simplified analysis.

=== Japanese ===
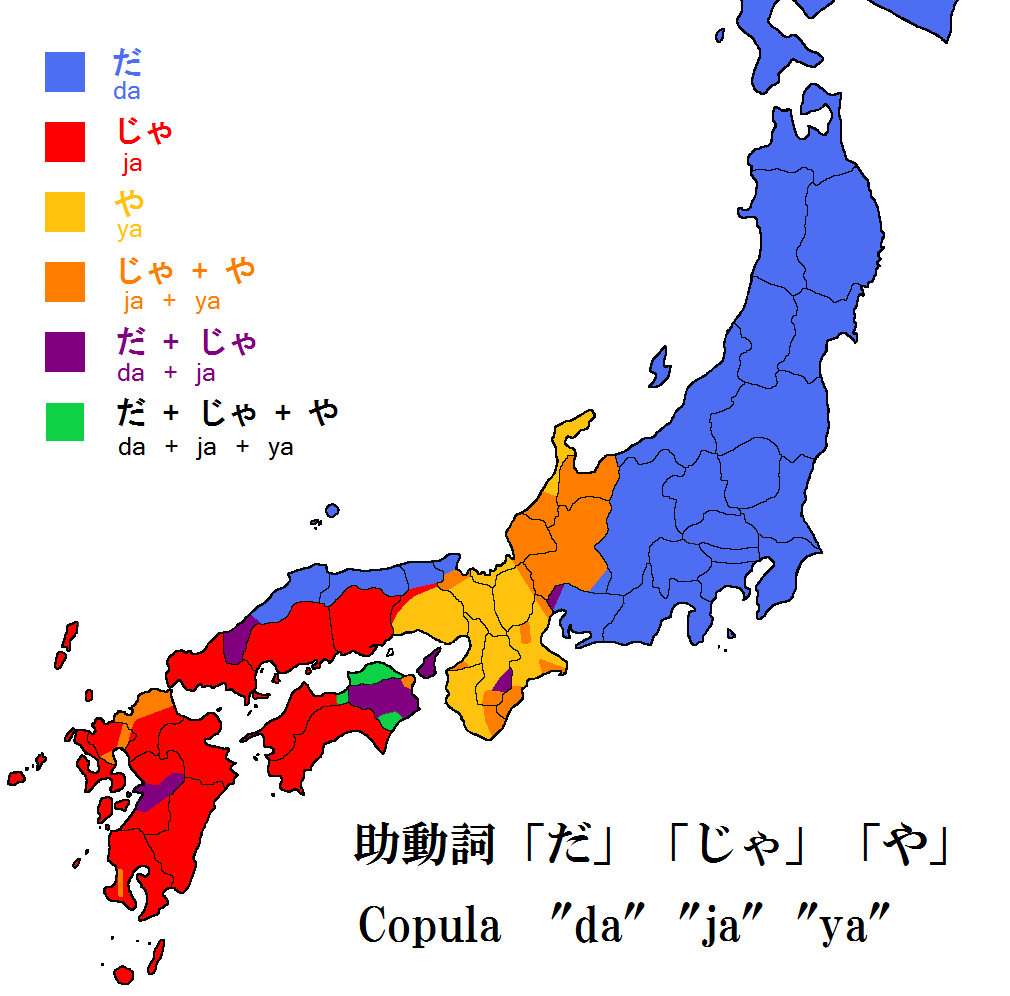
Japanese copulae in the mid 20th century

The Japanese copula (most often translated into English as an inflected form of "to be") is unique among verbs in Japanese. It is highly irregular, and in several ways behaves in ways other verbs do not; such as requiring a separate relativised form in some circumstances, and acting simply as a marker of formality/politeness with no predication force in some circumstances. In the most basic case, it behaves like a normal verb with irregular forms, which (like most copulas crosslinguistically) takes a non-case-marked complement instead of an object.

私 は 学生 だ。
Watashi wa gakusei da.
I TOP student COP
'I'm a student.'

これ は ペン です。
Kore wa pen desu.
this TOP pen COP-POL
'This is a pen.'

As with all verbs in Japanese, it is necessary to mark the speaker's implied social relationship to the addressee by the choice of verb form. The following two sentences differ only in the fact that the first is appropriate only between decently close friends or family, or said by someone of significantly higher social status than the listener, and the second is only appropriate outside of such circumstances.

あれはホテルだ。	Are wa hoteru da.	'That's a hotel.'
あれはホテルです。	Are wa hoteru desu.	'That is a hotel.'

Japanese has two classes of words which correspond to adjectives in English, one of which requires a copula to become a predicate and one of which does not.

このビールはおいしい。	Kono bīru wa oishii.	'This beer is delicious.'
このビールは豪華だ。	Kono bīru wa gouka da.	'This beer is extravagant.'
^{*}このビールはおいしいだ。	^{*}Kono bīru wa oishii da.	Invalid, as oishii is its own predicate and does not need a copula to make it a predicate

However, the polite copula desu is used as a means to mark the self-predicating class of adjectives as grammatically formal, and thus the formal equivalent of kono bīru wa oishii is kono bīru wa oishii desu. In these situations, the copula is not serving as an actual predication device; it is only a means to supply formality marking.

The non-self-predicating class of adjectives is the one place in modern Japanese where a separate relativiser form appears; these require the form na in order to modify nouns.

このビールはおいしい。	Kono bīru wa oishii.	'This beer is delicious.'
おいしいビール	oishii bīru	'delicious beer'
このビールは豪華だ。	Kono bīru wa gouka da.	'This beer is extravagant.'
豪華なビール	gouka na bīru	'extravagant beer'
^{*}豪華ビール	^{*}gouka bīru	Invalid, as this class of adjectives cannot just be placed next to a noun to modify it
^{*}豪華だビール	^{*}gouka da bīru	Invalid, as the copula form da requires a specially marked form when it heads a relative clause, unlike all other verbs in modern Japanese

Etymologically the copula is a reduced form of de aru, which effectively means 'exists as'; in formal situations de aru or its formal form de arimasu can appear in place of da or desu, and in certain situations other forms of aru may be appropriate (such as gozaru/gozaimasu). Nonstandard forms such as や ya in Kansai and じゃ ja in much of the rest of western Japan (see map above) are due to various dialects reducing de aru differently than the Kantō-based standard form did.

The negative form of the copula is generally de wa nai or its reduced form ja nai (or in formal situations, substitute arimasen for nai). This includes the topic marker wa, due to negative copula sentences typically implying some kind of contrastive topic-like force on the complement. De nai can occur in relative clauses, where information structure marking might be odd, but de wa nai is also a general negative copula and would be sensible still in any situation de nai might be used.

Many sentences in Japanese are structurally a headless relative clause nominalised by no (or its reduced form n) and then predicated with a copula; the structure is analogous to something like English it's that.... This structure is used to indicate that the statement is intended to answer a question or explain confusion a listener may have had (though the question it answers may not have ever been overtly spoken). This has largely been incorporated into Japanese's sentence-final particle system and is far more common than the equivalent English structure.

そこにある。	Soko ni aru.	'It's over there.'
そこにあるんだ。	Soko ni aru n da.	'(What's going on is that) it's over there.'

Similarly, ja nai has also been recruited into the sentence-final particle system, and is used to mark a sentence that the speaker should have been decently obvious to the listener, or to indicate that the speaker is surprised to find that the sentence is true. In this role it can cooccur with an actual predicative ja nai, but not with the positive da; da is omitted in such sentences.

明日じゃない！	Ashita ja nai!	'Why, it's tomorrow!' (differs from "It's not tomorrow" only by intonation; ja nai as a sentence-final particle is not a separate phonological unit while as a negative copula it is)
明日じゃないじゃない！	Ashita ja nai ja nai!	'Why, it isn't tomorrow!'

=== Korean ===
For sentences with predicate nominatives, the copula 이 (i-) is added to the predicate nominative (with no space in between).

바나나는 과일이다.	Ba-na-na-neun gwa-il-i-da.	'Bananas are a fruit.'

Some adjectives (usually colour adjectives) are nominalized and used with the copula 이 (i-).

1. Without the copula 이 (i-):

장미는 빨개요.	Jang-mi-neun ppal-gae-yo.	'Roses are red.'

2. With the copula 이 (i-):

장미는 빨간색이다.	Jang-mi-neun ppal-gan-saek-i-da	'Roses are red-coloured.'

Some Korean adjectives are derived using the copula. Separating these articles and nominalizing the former part will often result in a sentence with a related, but different meaning. Using the separated sentence in a situation where the un-separated sentence is appropriate is usually acceptable as the listener can decide what the speaker is trying to say using the context.

=== Chinese ===
In Chinese, both states and qualities are, in general, expressed with stative verbs (SV) with no need for a copula, e.g., in Chinese, "to be tired" (累 lèi), "to be hungry" (饿 è), "to be located at" (在 zài), "to be stupid" (笨 bèn) and so forth. A sentence can consist simply of a pronoun and such a verb: for example, 我饿 wǒ è ('I am hungry'). Usually, however, verbs expressing qualities are qualified by an adverb (meaning "very", "not", "quite", etc.); when not otherwise qualified, they are often preceded by 很 hěn, which in other contexts means "very", but in this use often has no particular meaning.

Only sentences with a noun as the complement (e.g., "This is my sister") use the copular verb "to be": 是; shì. This is used frequently; for example, instead of having a verb meaning "to be Chinese", the usual expression is "to be a Chinese person" (我是中国人; 我是中國人; wǒ shì Zhōngguórén; lit. 'I am a Chinese person'; 'I am Chinese'). This 是 is sometimes called an equative verb. Another possibility is for the complement to be just a noun modifier (ending in 的; de), the noun being omitted: 我的汽车是红色的; wǒ de qìchē shì hóngsè de; 'My car is red. (noun phrase indicator)'

Before the Han dynasty, the character 是 served as a demonstrative pronoun meaning "this" (this usage survives in some idioms and proverbs). Some linguists believe that 是 developed into a copula because it often appeared, as a repetitive subject, after the subject of a sentence (in classical Chinese we can say, for example, "George W. Bush, this president of the United States" meaning "George W. Bush is the president of the United States"). The character 是 appears to be formed as a compound of characters with the meanings of "early" and "straight."

Another use of 是 in modern Chinese is in combination with the modifier 的 de to mean "yes" or to show agreement. For example:

Question: 你的汽车是不是红色的？ nǐ de qìchē shì bú shì hóngsè de? 'Is your car red or not?'

Response: 是的 shì de 'Is', meaning "Yes", or 不是 bú shì 'Not is', meaning "No."

(A more common way of showing that the person asking the question is correct is by simply saying "right" or "correct", 对 duì; the corresponding negative answer is 不对 bú duì 'not right'.)

Yet another use of 是 is in the shì...(de) construction, which is used to emphasize a particular element of the sentence; see Chinese grammar § Cleft sentences.

In Hokkien 是 sī acts as the copula, and 是 /z/ is the equivalent in Wu Chinese. Cantonese uses 係 (Jyutping: hai6) instead of 是; similarly, Hakka uses 係 he^{55}.

=== Siouan languages ===
In Siouan languages such as Lakota, in principle almost all words—according to their structure—are verbs. So not only (transitive, intransitive and so-called "stative") verbs but even nouns often behave like verbs and do not need to have copulas.

For example, the word wičháša refers to a man, and the verb 'to be a man' is expressed as wimáčhaša/winíčhaša/wičháša 'I am/you are/he is a man'. Yet there also is a copula héčha 'to be a ...' that in most cases is used: wičháša hemáčha/heníčha/héčha 'I am/you are/he is a man'.

In order to express the statement 'I am a doctor of profession', one has to say pezuta wičháša hemáčha. But, in order to express that that person is THE doctor (say, that had been phoned to help), one must use another copula iyé 'to be the one':

pežúta wičháša (kiŋ) miyé yeló
medicine-man DEF ART I-am-the-one MALE ASSERT
'I am the doctor'

In order to refer to space (e.g., Robert is in the house), various verbs are used, e.g., yaŋkÁ (lit., 'to sit') for humans, or háŋ/hé 'to stand upright' for inanimate objects of a certain shape. "Robert is in the house" could be translated as Robert thimáhel yaŋké (yeló), whereas "There's one restaurant next to the gas station" translates as Owótethipi wígli-oínažiŋ kiŋ hél isákhib waŋ hé.

=== Constructed languages ===
The constructed language Lojban has two words that act similar to a copula in natural languages. The clause me ... me'u turns whatever follows it into a predicate that means to be (among) what it follows. For example, me la .bob. (me'u) means "to be Bob", and me le ci mensi (me'u) means "to be one of the three sisters". Another one is du, which is itself a predicate that means all its arguments are the same thing (equal). One word which is often confused for a copula in Lojban, but is not one, is cu. It merely indicates that the word which follows is the main predicate of the sentence. For example, lo pendo be mi cu zgipre means "my friend is a musician", but the word cu does not correspond to English is; instead, the word zgipre, which is a predicate, corresponds to the entire phrase "is a musician". The word cu is used to prevent lo pendo be mi zgipre, which would mean "the friend-of-me type of musician".

== See also ==
- Indo-European copula
- Nominal sentence
- Stative verb
- Subject complement
- Zero copula

== General references ==
- Moro, Andrea (March 2018). A Brief History of The Verb "to be". MIT Press. p. 304. ISBN 978-0-262-03712-9.
- Bram, Barli (5 July 1995). Write Well: Improving Writing Skills. Yogyakarta, Indonesia: Penerbit Kanisius. p. 128. ISBN 978-979-497-378-3.
- Everaert, Martin; van Riemsdijk, Henk, eds. (2006). The Blackwell Companion to Syntax, Volumes I–V (illustrated, revised ed.). Wiley-Blackwell. p. 849. ISBN 978-1-4051-1485-1. (See "copular sentences" and "existential sentences and expletive there" in Volume II.)
- Howe, Catherine; Desmarattes, Jean Lionel (1990). Haitian Creole Newspaper Reader. Dunwoody Press. p. 232. ISBN 978-0-931745-59-1.
- Kneale, William and Martha Kneale (1962). The Development of Logic. Oxford: Clarendon Press. ISBN 0-19-824183-6. OCLC 373178.
- Moro, A. (1997) The Raising of Predicates. Cambridge University Press, Cambridge, England.
- Smith, Ron F; O'Connell, Loraine M. (March 2003). Editing Today Workbook (2nd ed.). Wiley-Blackwell. p. 264. ISBN 978-0-8138-1317-2.
- Tüting, A. W. (December 2003). Essay on Lakota syntax. Archived 2011-07-19 at the Wayback Machine.
- Valdman, Albert; Rosemond, Renote (1988). Ann Pale Kreyòl: An Introductory Course in Haitian Creole. Illustrations: Philippe, Pierre-Henri (Illustrated ed.). Creole Institute, Indiana University. ISBN 978-0-929236-00-1.
