= Complimentary =

Complimentary may refer to:

- Compliment (disambiguation)
- Complimentary language and gender
- Free of charge

== See also ==
- Complementary (disambiguation)
