= Linking verb =

Grammar concept

In traditional grammar and guide books, a linking verb is a verb that describes the subject by connecting it to a predicate adjective or predicate noun (collectively known as subject complements).

Linking verbs include copulas such as the English verb be and its various forms, as well as verbs of perception such as look, sound, or taste and some other verbs that describe the subject, such as seem, become, or remain. In addition to predicate adjectives and predicate nouns, English allows for predicate prepositional phrases as well: John is behind the cocktail cabinet.

The following sentences include linking verbs.

- Roses are red.
- The detective felt sick.
- The soup tasted weird.
- Frankenstein's monster resembles a zombie.
- He quickly grew tired.
- You are becoming a nuisance.

== See also ==
- List of English copulae
