= Predicative expression =

Part of a clause predicate

A predicative expression (or just predicative) is part of a clause predicate, and is an expression that typically follows a copula or linking verb, e.g. be, seem, appear, or that appears as a second complement (object complement) of a certain type of verb, e.g. call, make, name, etc. The most frequently acknowledged types of predicative expressions are predicative adjectives (also predicate adjectives) and predicative nominals (also predicate nominals). The main trait of all predicative expressions is that they serve to express a property that is assigned to a "subject", whereby this subject is usually the clause subject, but at times it can be the clause object. A primary distinction is drawn between predicative (also predicate) and attributive expressions. Further, predicative expressions are typically not clause arguments, and they are also typically not clause adjuncts. There is hence a three-way distinction between predicative expressions, arguments, and adjuncts.

The terms predicative expression on the one hand, and subject complement and object complement on the other hand overlap in meaning to a large extent.

== Examples ==
The most widely acknowledged predicative expressions are adjectives and nominals:

The idea was ridiculous. — Predicative adjective over the subject.
He seems nice. — Predicative adjective over the subject.

Bob is a postman. — Predicative nominal over the subject.
They were all happy campers. — Predicative nominal over the subject.

That shrimp dish made him sick. — Predicative adjective over the object.
We painted the door white. — Predicative adjective over the object.

They elected him president. — Predicative nominal over the object.
They called Jill a thief. — Predicative nominal over the object.

The formulations "over the subject" and "over the object" indicate that the predicative expression is expressing a property that is assigned to the subject or to the object. For example, the predicative expression a thief in the last sentence serves to assign to Jill the property of being a thief. Predicative nominals over subjects are also called predicate nominatives, a term borrowed from Latin grammars and indicating the morphological case that such expressions bear (in Latin).

== Further examples ==
While the most widely acknowledged predicative expressions are adjectives and nominals, most syntactic categories can be construed as predicative expressions, e.g.

The snake is in the bag. — Predicative prepositional phrase.
That is when it happens. — Predicative clause.
It is soon. — Predicative adverb.

There are, however, certain categories that cannot appear as predicative expressions. Adverbs ending in -ly, for instance, cannot appear as predicative expressions, e.g.

*The event was splendidly. — Failed attempt to use an adverb ending in -ly as a predicative expression.
*Our ideas are insightfully. — Failed attempt to use an adverb ending in -ly as a predicative expression.

These examples raise the following fundamental question: What characteristic of words and phrases allows or prohibits them from appearing as predicative expressions? The answer to this question is not apparent.

== Predicative adjectives vs. attributive adjectives ==
Predicative expressions are not attributive expressions. The distinction is illustrated best using predicative and attributive adjectives:

a. The man is friendly. — Predicative adjective.
b. the friendly man — Attributive adjective.

a. One snake was large. — Predicative adjective.
b. one large snake — Attributive adjective.

a. His bag is damp. — Predicative adjective.
b. his damp bag — Attributive adjective.

A given clause usually contains a single predicative expression (unless coordination is involved), but it can contain multiple attributive expressions, e.g. The friendly man found a large snake in his damp bag.

== Predicative adjectives vs. postpositive adjectives ==
Postpositive adjectives are attributive adjectives which modify the immediately preceding noun or pronoun to create a noun phrase. (A predicate adjective is frequently preceded by a linking verb.) Postpositive adjectives are rare in English, but common in many other languages.

a. Something is different. — Predicative adjective.
b. I want something different. — Postpositive adjective.

a. He is taller than you. — Predicative adjective.
b. I met a person taller than you — Postpositive adjective.

== Predicatives vs. arguments and adjuncts ==
Predicative expressions are typically not arguments, e.g.

a. She was our friend. — Predicative nominal.
b. She visited our friend. — Argument nominal.

a. That is an excuse. — Predicative nominal.
b. He produced an excuse. — Argument nominal.

The predicative expressions here are properties that are assigned to the subject, whereas the arguments cannot be construed as such properties. Predicative expressions are also typically not adjuncts, e.g.

a. The bag is under the bed. — Predicative prepositional phrase.
b. Something is moving under the bed. — Adjunct prepositional phrase.

a. The dispute was after the talk was completely over. — Predicative clause.
b. Everybody relaxed after the talk was completely over. — Adjunct clause.

The predicative expressions again serve to assign a property to the subject, e.g. the property of being under the bed. In contrast, the adjuncts serve to establish the situational context. One can hence acknowledge a three-way distinction between predicative expressions, arguments, and adjuncts. However, upon deeper examination, the lines between these categories become blurred and overlap can occur. For instance, in the sentence Bill arrived drunk, one can judge drunk to be both a predicative expression (because it serves to assign a property to Bill) and an adjunct (because it appears optionally in the sentence).

== In other languages ==
Predicative expressions exist in most if not all languages. In languages that have morphological case, predicative nominals typically appear in the nominative case (e.g., German and Russian) or instrumental case (e.g. Russian), although predicative expressions over objects generally bear the same case as the object. Some languages lack an equivalent of the copula be, and many languages omit the copula in some contexts or optionally, which means that the case marker plays a greater role since it helps distinguish predicative nominals from argument nominals. Some languages (e.g., Tabasaran, Pacoh) have a separate predicative case.

== See also ==
- Nominal sentence
