= Complement (linguistics) =

Word or phrase necessary to complete an expression

In grammar, a complement is a word, phrase, or clause that is necessary to complete the meaning of a given expression. Complements are often also arguments (expressions that help complete the meaning of a predicate).

== Predicative, subject and object complements ==
In many non-theoretical grammars, the terms subject complement (also called a predicative of the subject) and object complement are employed to denote the predicative expressions (predicative complements), such as predicative adjectives and nominals (also called a predicative nominative or predicate nominative), that serve to assign a property to a subject or an object:

Ryan is upset. – Predicative adjective as subject complement
Rachelle is the boss. – Predicative nominal as subject complement

That made Michael lazy. – Predicative adjective as object complement
We call Rachelle the boss. – Predicative nominal as object complement

This terminology is used in grammar books:

Type	Verb	Example	Elements
SV	intransitive	The sun is shining.	subject, verb
SVO	monotransitive	That lecture bored me.	subject, verb, object
SVC	copular	Your dinner seems ready.	subject, verb, subject complement
SVA	copular	My office is in the next building.	subject, verb, predicative complement
SVOO	ditransitive	I must send my parents an anniversary card.	subject, verb, indirect object, direct object
SVOC	complex-transitive	Most students have found her reasonably helpful.	subject, verb, object, object complement
SVOA	complex-transitive	You can put the dish on the table.	subject, verb, object, adverbial

However, this use of terminology is avoided by many modern theories of syntax, which typically view the expressions in bold as part of the clause predicate, which means they are not complements of the subject or object but rather are properties that are predicated of the subject or object.

The Cambridge Grammar of the English Language assigns the term "predicative complement" to both uses and shifts the terminological distinction to the verb:

Ed seemed quite competent: — complex-intransitive verb + predicative complement
She considered Ed quite competent : — complex-transitive verb + predicative complement

== As arguments ==
In many modern grammars (for instance in those that build on the X-bar framework), the object argument of a verbal predicate is called a complement. In fact, this use of the term is the one that currently dominates in linguistics. A main aspect of this understanding of complements is that the subject is usually not a complement of the predicate:

He wiped the counter. – the counter is the object complement of the verb wiped.
She scoured the tub. – the tub is the object complement of the verb scoured.

While it is less common to do so, one sometimes extends this reasoning to subject arguments:

He wiped the counter. – He is the subject complement of the verb wiped.
She scoured the tub. – She is the subject complement of the verb scoured.

In those examples, the subject and object arguments are taken to be complements. In this area, the terms complement and argument thus overlap in meaning and use. Note that this practice takes a subject complement to be something very different from the subject complements of traditional grammar, which are predicative expressions, as just mentioned above.

== Broadly construed ==
Construed in the broadest sense, any time a given expression is somehow necessary in order to render another expression "complete", it can be characterized as a complement of that expression:

with the class – The noun phrase the class is the complement of the preposition, with.
Jim will help. – The main verb help is the complement of the auxiliary verb, will.
Chris gave up. – The particle up is the complement of the verb gave.
as a friend – The noun phrase a friend is the complement of the preposition, as.

Construed in the broad sense, many complements cannot be understood as arguments. The argument concept is tied to the predicate concept in a way that the complement concept is not.

In linguistics, an adjunct is an optional, or structurally dispensable, part of a sentence, clause, or phrase that, when it is removed, will not affect the remainder of the sentence except to discard from it some auxiliary information. A more detailed definition of the adjunct emphasizes its attribute as a modifying form, word, or phrase that depends on another form, word, or phrase, being an element of clause structure with adverbial function. An adjunct is not an argument or a predicative expression, and an argument is not an adjunct. The argument–adjunct distinction is central in most theories of syntax and semantics. The terminology used to denote arguments and adjuncts can vary depending on the theory at hand. Some dependency grammars, for instance, employ the term circonstant (instead of adjunct) and follow Tesnière (1959).

== See also ==
- Adjunct
- Argument
- Predicate
- Predicative expression
- Subject complement

== Sources ==
- Borsley, R. 1991. Syntactic theory: A unified approach. Cambridge, MA: Blackwell Publishers.
- Brinton, L. 2000. The structure of modern English. Amsterdam: John Benjamins Publishing Company.
- Burton-Roberts, N. 1997. Analysing sentences: An introduction to English grammar. London: Longman.
- Cowper, E. 2009. A concise introduction to syntactic theory: The government-binding approach. Chicago: The University of Chicago Press.
- Crystal, D. 1997. A dictionary of linguistics and phonetics, 4th edition, Oxford, UK: Blackwell.
- Downing, A. and P. Locke. 1992. English grammar: A university course, second edition. London: Routledge.
- Fromkin, V. et al. 2000. Linguistics: An introduction to linguistic theory. Malden, MA: Blackwell Publishers.
- Horrocks, G. 1986. Generative Grammar. Longman: London.
- Huddleston, R. 1988. English grammar: An outline. Cambridge, UK: Cambridge University Press.
- Huddleston, Rodney and Geoffrey K Pullum, 2002, The Cambridge Grammar of the English Language, Cambridge, Cambridge University Press. ISBN 0521431468
- Lester, M. 1971. Introductory transformational grammar of English. New York: Holt, Rinehart and Winston, Inc.
- Matthews, P. 1981. Syntax. Cambridge, UK: Cambridge University Press.
- Miller, J. 2011. A critical introduction to syntax. London: continuum.
- Pollard, C. and I. Sag. 1994. Head-Driven Phrase Structure Grammar. Chicago: The University Press of Chicago.
- Quirk, Randolph, Sidney Greenbaum, Geoffrey Leech and Jan Svartvik, 1985, A Comprehensive Grammar of Contemporary English, Longman, London ISBN 0582517346.
- Radford, A. 2004. English syntax: An introduction. Cambridge, UK: Cambridge University Press.
- Thomas, L. 1993. Beginning syntax. Oxford, UK: Blackwell.
