= Predicate (grammar) =

Linguistic term

The term predicate is used in two ways in linguistics and its subfields. The first defines a predicate as everything in a standard declarative sentence except the subject, and the other defines it as only the main content verb or associated predicative expression of a clause. Thus, by the first definition, the predicate of the sentence Frank likes cake is likes cake, while by the second definition, it is only the content verb likes, and Frank and cake are the arguments of this predicate. The conflict between these two definitions can lead to confusion.

== Syntax ==
=== Traditional grammar ===
The notion of a predicate in traditional grammar traces back to Aristotelian logic. A predicate is seen as a property that a subject has or is characterized by. A predicate is therefore an expression that can be true of something. Thus, the expression "is moving" is true of anything that is moving. This classical understanding of predicates was adopted more or less directly into Latin and Greek grammars; from there, it made its way into English grammars, where it is applied directly to the analysis of sentence structure. It is also the understanding of predicates as defined in English-language dictionaries. The predicate is one of the two main parts of a sentence (the other being the subject, which the predicate modifies). (Note: See for instance College Dictionary (1993, p. 1077) and Merriam Webster (2004, p. 566).) The predicate must contain a verb, and the verb requires or permits other elements to complete the predicate, or else precludes them from doing so. These elements are objects (direct, indirect, prepositional), predicatives, and adjuncts:

She dances. — Verb-only predicate.
Ben reads the book. — Verb-plus-direct-object predicate.
Ben's mother, Felicity, gave me a present. — Verb-plus-indirect-object-plus-direct-object predicate.
She listened to the radio. — Verb-plus-prepositional-object predicate.
She is in the park. — Verb-plus-predicative-prepositional-phrase predicate.
She met him in the park. — Verb-plus-direct-object-plus-adjunct predicate.

The predicate provides information about the subject, such as what the subject is, what the subject is doing, or what the subject is like. The relation between a subject and its predicate is sometimes called a nexus. A predicative nominal is a noun phrase: in the sentence George III is the king of England, the phrase the king of England is the predicative nominal. In English, the subject and predicative nominal must be connected by a linking verb, also called a copula. A predicative adjective is an adjective, such as in Ivano is attractive, attractive being the predicative adjective. The subject and predicative adjective must also be connected by a copula.

=== Modern theories of syntax ===
Some theories of syntax adopt a subject-predicate distinction. For instance, a phrase structure grammar textbook typically divides an English declarative sentence (S) into a noun phrase (NP) and verb phrase (VP). The subject NP is shown in green, and the predicate VP in blue. Languages with more flexible word order (often called nonconfigurational languages) are often also treated differently in phrase structure approaches.

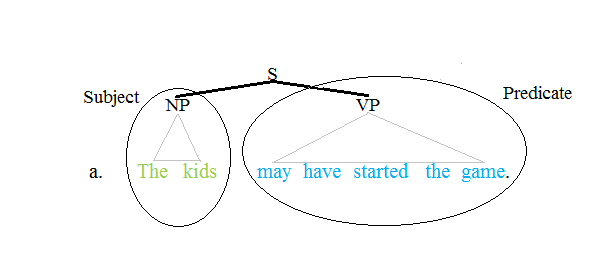

On the other hand, dependency grammar rejects the binary subject-predicate division and places the finite verb as the root of the sentence. The matrix predicate is marked in blue, and its two arguments are in green. While the predicate cannot be construed as a constituent in the formal sense, it is a catena. Barring a discontinuity, predicates and their arguments are always catenae in dependency structures.

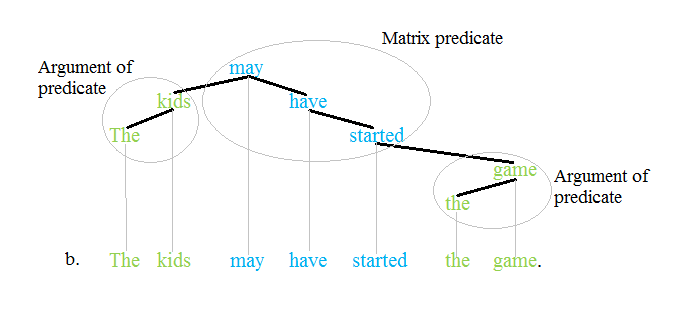

Some theories of grammar accept both a binary division of sentences into subject and predicate while also giving the head of the predicate a special status. In such contexts, the term predicator is used to refer to that head.

=== Non-subject predicands ===
There are cases in which the semantic predicand has a syntactic function other than subject. This happens in raising constructions, such as the following:

| What | makes | you | think | that? |
| | | OBJ |

Here, you is the object of the make verb phrase, the head of the main clause, but it is also the predicand of the subordinate think clause, which has no subject.

== Semantic predication ==
The term predicate is also used to refer to properties and to words or phrases which denote them. This usage of the term comes from the concept of a predicate in logic. In logic, predicates are symbols which are interpreted as relations or functions over arguments. In semantics, the denotations of some linguistic expressions are analyzed along similar lines. Expressions which denote predicates in the semantic sense are sometimes themselves referred to as "predication".

=== Carlson classes ===
The seminal work of Greg Carlson distinguishes between types of predicates. Based on Carlson's work, predicates have been divided into the following subclasses, which roughly pertain to how a predicate relates to its subject.

==== Stage-level predicates ====
A stage-level predicate is true of a temporal stage of its subject. For example, if John is "hungry", then he typically will eat some food. His state of being hungry therefore lasts a certain amount of time, and not his entire lifespan. Stage-level predicates can occur in a wide range of grammatical constructions and are probably the most versatile kind of predicate.

==== Individual-level predicates ====
An individual-level predicate is true throughout the existence of an individual. For example, if John is "smart", this is a property that he has, regardless of which particular point in time we consider. Individual-level predicates are more restricted than stage-level ones. Individual-level predicates cannot occur in presentational "there" sentences (a star in front of a sentence indicates that it is odd or ill-formed):

There are police available. — available is stage-level predicate.
*There are firemen altruistic. — altruistic is an individual-level predicate.

Stage-level predicates allow modification by manner adverbs and other adverbial modifiers. Individual-level predicates do not, e.g.

Tyrone spoke French loudly in the corridor. — speak French can be interpreted as a stage-level predicate.
*Tyrone knew French silently in the corridor. — know French cannot be interpreted as a stage-level predicate.

When an individual-level predicate occurs in past tense, it gives rise to what is called a lifetime effect: The subject must be assumed to be dead or otherwise out of existence.

John was available. — Stage-level predicate does NOT evoke the lifetime effect.
John was altruistic. — Individual-level predicate does evoke the lifetime effect.

==== Kind-level predicates ====
A kind-level predicate is true of a kind of a thing, but cannot be applied to individual members of the kind. An example of this is the predicate are widespread. One cannot meaningfully say of a particular individual John that he is widespread; one may only say this of kinds, as in

Cats are widespread.

Certain types of noun phrases cannot be the subject of a kind-level predicate. We have just seen that a proper name cannot be. Singular indefinite noun phrases are also banned from this environment:

*A cat is widespread. — Compare: Nightmares are widespread.

==== Collective vs. distributive predicates ====
Predicates may also be collective or distributive. Collective predicates require their subjects to be somehow plural, while distributive ones do not. An example of a collective predicate is "formed a line". This predicate can only stand in a nexus with a plural subject:

The students formed a line. — Collective predicate appears with plural subject.
*The student formed a line. — Collective predicate cannot appear with singular subject.

Other examples of collective predicates include meet in the woods, surround the house, gather in the hallway and carry the piano together. Note that the last one (carry the piano together) can be made non-collective by removing the word together. Quantifiers differ with respect to whether or not they can be the subject of a collective predicate. For example, quantifiers formed with all the can, while ones formed with every or each cannot.

All the students formed a line. — Collective predicate possible with all the.
All the students gathered in the hallway. — Collective predicate possible with all the.
All the students carried a piano together. — Collective predicate possible with all the.
*Every student formed a line. — Collective predicate impossible with every.
*Each student gathered in the hallway. — Collective predicate impossible with each.

== See also ==
- Clause
- Categorical proposition
- Dependency grammar
- Inflectional phrase
- Meaning-text theory
- Phrase
- Phrase structure grammar
- Predicative expression
- Secondary predicate
- Term logic
- Topic–comment
- Traditional grammar
- Verb

== Literature ==
- Allerton, D (1979). Essentials of grammatical theory. London: Routledge & Kegan Paul.
- Ackerman, F.; Webelhuth, G. (1998). A theory of predicates. Stanford, CA: CSLI Publications.
- Burton-Roberts, N (2016). Analysing sentences: An introduction to English Syntax. London: Longman. ISBN 9781317293835.
- The American Heritage College Dictionary (third ed.). Boston: Houghton Mifflin Company. 1993.
- Bennet, P. (1995). A course in Generalized Phrase Structure Grammar. London: UCL Press Limited.
- Brown, E.K.; Miller, J.E. (1991). Syntax: A linguistic introduction to sentence structure. London: Routledge. ISBN 9780415084215.
- Carlson, G. (1977). A unified analysis of the English bare plural (PDF). Linguistics and Philosophy 1. Vol. 3. pp. 413–58. Archived from the original (PDF) on 2018-09-20.
- Carlson, G. (1977). Reference to Kinds in English. New York: Garland.
  - Also distributed by Indiana University Linguistics Club and GLSA UMass/Amherst.
- Carnie, A. (2007). Syntax: A generative introduction (2nd ed.). Malden, MA: Blackwell Publishing.
- Cattell, R. (1984). Composite predicates in English. Syntax and Semantics 17. Sydney: Academic Press.
- Chomsky, N. (1965). Aspects of the theory of syntax. Cambridge, MA: MIT Press.
- Cowper, E. (1992). A concise introduction to syntactic theory: The government-binding approach. Chicago: The University of Chicago Press.
- Culicover, P. (1997). Principles and Parameters: An introduction to syntactic theory. Oxford University Press.
- Downing, A.; Locke, P. (1992). English grammar: A university course (second ed.). London: Routledge.
- Fromkin, V (2013). Linguistics: An introduction to linguistic theory. Malden, MA: Blackwell. ISBN 9781118670910.
- Haegeman, L. (1994). Introduction to government and binding theory (2nd ed.). Oxford: Blackwell.
- Harrocks, G. (1987). Generative Grammar. London: Longman.
- Huddleston, R. (1988). English grammar: An outline. Cambridge: Cambridge University Press.
- Kroeger, P. (2005). Analyzing Grammar: An Introduction. Cambridge: Cambridge University Press. ISBN 9781139443517.
- Langendoen, T. (1970). The study of syntax: The generative-transformational approach to the study of English. New York: Holt, Rinehart and Winston.
- Lockwood, D. (2002). Syntactic analysis and description: A constructional approach. London: continuum.
- Matthews, P. (1981). Syntax. Cambridge: Cambridge University Press.
- McCawley, T. (1988). The syntactic phenomena of English. Vol. 1. Chicago: University of Chicago Press.
- The Merriam Webster Dictionary. Springfield, MA: Merriam-Webster. 2004.
- Napoli, D. (1989). Predication theory: A case study for indexing theory. Cambridge: Cambridge University Press.
- Napoli, D. (1993). Syntax: Theory and problems. New York: Oxford University Press.
- Osborne, T.; Putnam, M.; Groß, T. (2012). "Catenae: Introducing a novel unit of syntactic analysis". Syntax. 15 (4): 354–396. doi:10.1111/j.1467-9612.2012.00172.x.
- Oxford Concise dictionary of Linguistics. New York: Oxford University Press. 1997.
- Oxford Dictionary of English Grammar. New York: Oxford University Press. 2014.
- Parisi, D.; Antinucci, F. (1976). Essentials of grammar. Translated by Bates, E. New York: Academic Press.
- van Riemsdijk, H.; Williams, E. (1986). Introduction to the theory of grammar. Cambridge, MA: The MIT Press.
- Thomas, L. (1993). Beginning syntax. Oxford: Blackwell.
