= Subject complement =

Predicative expression

In traditional grammar, a subject complement is a predicative expression that follows a copula (commonly known as a linking verb), which complements the subject of a clause by means of characterization that completes the meaning of the subject.

When a noun, noun phrase, or pronoun functions as a subject complement, it is called a predicative nominal. When an adjective or analogous phrase functions as subject complement, it is called a predicative adjective. In either case the predicative complement corresponds to the subject.

Within the small class of copulas that preface a subject complement, the verb be, or one of its concomitant forms, is the most common. Because a copula is an intransitive verb, subject complements are not customarily construed to be the object of the verb. They are often deemed to be neither arguments nor adjuncts of a predicate. A plural or singular subject, rather than a subject complement determines the grammatical number expressed by a copula.

== Examples ==
The subject complement is bold in the following examples:

- The lake was a tranquil pool. – Predicative nominal

Here, was is a copula (a concomitant form of be) that links the subject complement a tranquil pool (which has the head noun pool), to the subject the lake (which has the head noun lake).

- The lake is tranquil. – Predicative adjective

In this example, tranquil is a predicative adjective linked to the subject the lake via the copula is (another concomitant form of be).

An example in which the subject complement is a clause is:

- That is what I think. – Predicative clause

== Other languages ==
In some languages, adjectives are stative verbs and do not require a copula in predicative use.

== Disputed pronoun forms ==
Eighteenth-century grammarians such as Joseph Priestley justified the colloquial usage of subject complements in instances such as it is me (and it is him, he is taller than him, etc.) on the grounds that good writers use it often:

All our grammarians say, that the nominative cases of pronouns ought to follow the verb substantive as well as precede it; yet any familiar forms of speech and the example of some of our best writers would lead us to make a contrary rule; or, at least, would leave us at liberty to adopt which we liked best.

Other grammarians, including Baker (1770), Campbell (1776), and Lindley Murray (1795), say the first person pronoun must be I rather than me because it is a nominative that is equivalent to the subject. The opinions of these three partisans of the nominative case were accepted by the schoolmasters. However, modern grammarians such as Rodney Huddleston and Geoffrey K. Pullum deny that such a rule exists in English and claim that such opinions "confuse correctness with formality".

This argument for it is I is based on the model of Latin, where the complement of the finite copula is always in the nominative case (and where, unlike English, nominative and accusative are distinguished morphologically in all nominal parts of speech and not just in pronouns). The situation in English may, however, also be compared with that of French, where the historical accusative form moi functions as a so-called disjunctive pronoun, and appears as a subject complement (c'est moi, 'it is me'). Similarly, the clitic accusative form can serve as a subject complement as well as a direct object (il l'est 'he is [that/it]', cf. il l'aime 'he loves it').

Fiction writers have occasionally pointed out the colloquialisms of their characters in an authorial comment. In "The Curse of the Golden Cross", for example, G. K. Chesterton writes, "'He may be me,' said Father Brown, with cheerful contempt for grammar." And in The Lion, the Witch and the Wardrobe, C. S. Lewis writes, "'Come out, Mrs. Beaver. Come out, Sons and Daughters of Adam. It's all right! It isn't Her!' This was bad grammar of course, but that is how beavers talk when they are excited."
