= Non-finite clause =

Type of clause in grammar

In linguistics, a non-finite clause is a dependent or embedded clause that represents a state or event in the same way no matter whether it takes place before, during, or after text production. In this sense, a non-finite dependent clause represents one process as a circumstance for another without specifying the time when it takes place as in the following examples:

Non-Finite Dependent Clauses

- I'm going to Broadway to watch a play.
- I went to Broadway to watch a play.

Finite Dependent Clauses

- I'm going to Broadway so I can watch a play.
- I went to Broadway so I could watch a play.

Similarly, a non-finite embedded clause represents a qualification for something that is being represented as in the following examples:

Non-Finite Embedded Clauses

- I'm on a street called Bellevue Avenue.
- I was on a street called Bellevue Avenue.

Finite Embedded Clauses

- I'm on a street that is called Bellevue Avenue.
- I'm on a street that used to be called Bellevue Avenue.
- I was on a street that is called Bellevue Avenue.
- I was on a street that used to be called Bellevue Avenue.

In meaning-independent descriptions of language, a non-finite clause is a clause whose verbal chain is non-finite; for example, using Priscian's categories for Latin verb forms, in many languages we find texts with non-finite clauses containing infinitives, participles and gerunds. In such accounts, a non-finite clause usually serves a grammatical role – commonly that of a noun, adjective, or adverb – in a greater clause that contains it.

== Structure ==
A typical finite clause consists of a finite form of the verb together with its objects and other dependents (i.e. a verb phrase or predicate), along with its subject (although in certain cases the subject is not expressed). A non-finite clause is similar, except that the verb must be in a non-finite form (such as an infinitive, participle, gerund or gerundive), and it is consequently much more likely that there will be no subject expressed, i.e. that the clause will consist of a (non-finite) verb phrase on its own.

Some examples are given below.

Finite clauses

- Kids play on computers. (an independent clause)
- I know that kids play on computers. (a dependent (subordinate) clause, but still finite)
- Play on your computer! (an imperative sentence, an example of an independent finite clause lacking a subject)

Non-finite clauses

- Kids like to play on computers. (an infinitival clause using the English to-infinitive)
- It's easy for kids to play on computers. (an infinitival clause containing periphrastic expression of the subject)
- Playing on computers, they whiled the day away. (a participial clause, using a present participle)
- With the kids playing on their computers, we were able to enjoy some time alone. (a participial clause with a subject)
- Having played on computers all day, they were pale and hungry. (a participial clause using a past participle)
- Playing on computers is fun. (a gerund-participial clause)
- … he be playing on computers all the time. (a gerund-participial subjunctive clause)

Some types of non-finite clause have zero in one of the object or complement positions; the gap is usually understood to be filled by a noun from the larger clause in which the non-zero clause appears (as is the subject "gap" in most non-finite clauses). These clauses are also called hollow non-finite clauses.

Some examples:

- He is the man to beat. (infinitival clause with zero object; the man is understood as the object)
- That car wants looking at straight away. (gerund-participial clause with zero preposition complement after at)
- The building was given a new lease of life. (past-participial clause with zero indirect object)

For more examples of such constructions in English, see English passive voice and Uses of English verb forms § Uses of non-finite verbs.

== Use ==
As a dependent clause, a non-finite clause plays some kind of grammatical role within a larger clause that contains it. What this role can be, and what the consequent meaning is, depends on the type of non-finite verb involved, the constructions allowed by the grammar of the language in question, and the meanings of those constructions in that language. Some examples are noted below:

- To live is to suffer in silence. (infinitival clauses used as subject and predicative expression)
- I decided to bathe myself. (infinitival clause used as object)
- We went there to collect our computers. (infinitival clause used as an adverbial of purpose)
- They were sitting quietly. (participial clause used as verb complement to express progressive aspect)
- The man sitting quietly is the man to watch. (participial clause used as noun modifier)
- Well beaten, we slumped back to the dressing room. (participial clause used as nominative absolute)
- I like rescuing wasps. (gerund-participial clause used as a noun phrase)
- Carthago delenda est ("Carthage must be destroyed"; Latin gerundive used as a predicative expression)

== Different traditions ==
According to Priscian, delenda is a participle because it agrees in number, case, and gender with a noun, namely Carthago, the subject. In Priscian's theory of POS, words are classified according to the inflectional paradigms that are created independent of the grammatical context the word is in. A misapplication of Priscian's verb categories for the modern notion of non-finite clause might thus result on the recognition of clauses where there are none.

In linguistics, both Generative Theory and Systemic Functional Theory of Language do not support analyses of Carthago delenda est in the way it is proposed above. For instance, the French active non-finite verbs sorti(e) and entré(e) as in il est sorti/entré and elle est sortie/entrée agree in number and gender with the subject in the same way as delenda does, but these words are not considered a non-finite sentence in Generative Theory nor a non-finite clause in Systemic Functional Theory on their own. In the example Carthago delenda est/Carthago must be destroyed, the verb est is a modal voice auxiliary because it functions both as modal and as voice.

For more details of the use of such clauses in English, see Uses of English verb forms § Uses of non-finite verbs, and English passive voice.

== See also ==
- English clause syntax
- Supine
- Verbal noun
- Balancing and deranking
