= Centaur noun =

Type of Danish verbal noun

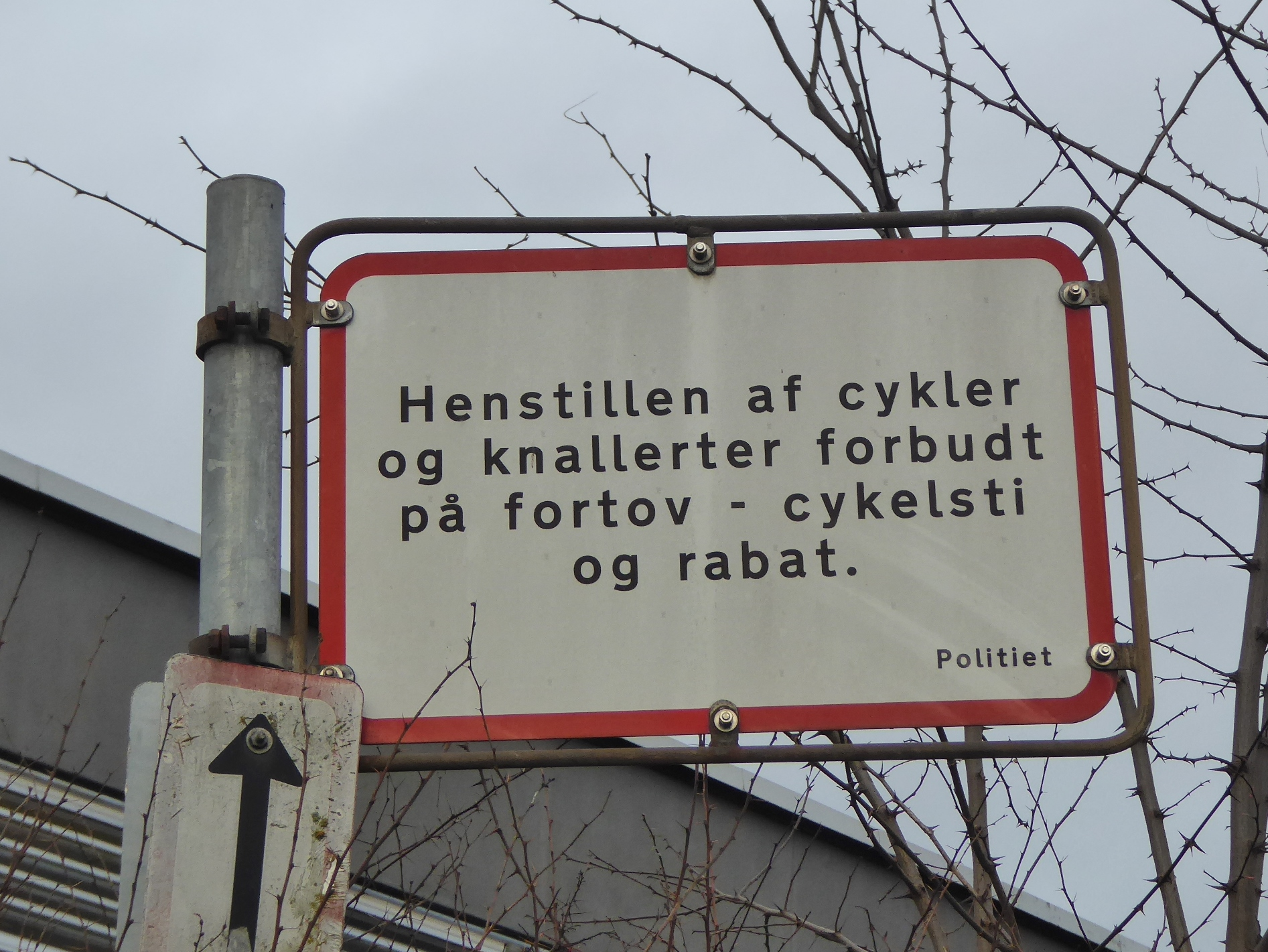
A sign in Denmark reading: 'The parking of bicycles and mopeds is prohibited on sidewalk – bicycle path and road verge'. Here, henstillen ('parking') is a centaur noun.

Centaur constructions (Danish: kentaurkonstruktioner), centaur nouns, centaur nominals or centaur nominalisations (kentaurnominaler), also referred to simply as a centaurs (kentaurer) or gerund forms (gerundiumformer) are a type of verbal noun which occur in the Danish language. They are productive, formed by adding -en to the verbal stem.

They differ from other verbal nouns by not having inflected forms for definite or plural, though genitive forms can be observed. Centaur nominalizations are invariably common gender and definiteness can be instead be indicated by a possessive or article in front of the word. Some examples include råben ('shouting'), medvirken ('contribution') and rislen ('trickling, rustling').

Similar to English gerunds or German substantivised infinitives, centaur nominals are not generally covered by dictionaries. However this is not universally true, for example jodlen ('yodling') and henstillen ('putting down; parking') appear in the orthographical reference Retskrivningsordbogen and Det Centrale Ordregister. On the other hand, a form like råben cannot be found in the Retskrivningsordbogen. These constructions are also often overlooked in grammar works. Danish: A Comprehensive Grammar, one of the largest English-language reference works for Danish, makes no mention of the constructions, at the same time stating that "Danish does not possess a gerund". This statement leaves room for interpretation as to whether centaur constructions should in fact be treated as distinct from gerunds. Even in the large monolingual Dansk Grammatik, the authors only dedicate half a page to the phenomenon.

Centaur nouns are used in the title of Søren Kirkegaard's work Fear and Trembling (Danish: Frygt og Bæven), in the lyrics of the 1963 Eurovision winner Dansevise "En rislen i bækken, en hvislen i hækken" ('A babbling in the brook, a whisper in the hedge') and in the poem Hvor smiler fager den danske Kyst ('How fairly the Danish coast smiles') where one line reads "som Vindens Rislen i Danmarks Korn" ('like the wind's rustling in Denmark's grain').

== See also ==
- Gerund
- Verbal noun
- Deverbal noun
