= Anthimeria =

Using one part of speech as another

In rhetoric, anthimeria or antimeria (from Ancient Greek: ἀντί, antí, 'against, opposite', and μέρος, méros, 'part'), means using one part of speech as another, such as using a noun as a verb: "The little old lady turtled along the road." In linguistics, this is called conversion; when a noun becomes a verb, it is a denominal verb, when a verb becomes a noun, it is a deverbal noun.

In English, many nouns have become verbs. For example, the noun "book" is now often used as a verb, as in the example "Let's book the flight". Other noun-as-verb usages include "I can keyboard that for you," "We need to scissor expenses," and "Desk him." Other substitutions could include an adjective used as a noun, as in "She dove into the foaming wet," interjection as verb, as in "Don't aha me!", a verb as a noun, as in "Help! I need some eat!" and so on.

== Examples ==
- I'll unhair thy head. (Shakespeare, Antony and Cleopatra, II, v.)
- The thunder would not peace at my bidding. (Shakespeare, King Lear, IV, vi.)
- Me, dictionary-ing heavily, "Where was the one they were watching?" (Ernest Hemingway, Green Hills of Africa)

Anthimeria is common in English. For example, "chill" was originally a noun, a synonym for "cold", but has become a verb, with meanings "to make cold" and, more recently, "to relax". An early example of this usage is in The Sugarhill Gang's 1979 hit 'Rapper's Delight': "There's... a time to break and a time to chill/ To act civilized or act real ill".

Medal has found its use verbally.

=== Slash ===
A more unusual case of anthimeria is displayed not through a change in lexical category but a change in form altogether. The punctuation mark '/' was originally used to juxtapose related words or phrases, such as a 'friend/roommate', meaning that the referred person is both a friend and a roommate. The symbol '/' (technically, named "virgule") is often pronounced 'slash', and now often used as a kind of conjunction or conjunctive adverb: "emergence of a new conjunction/conjunctive adverb (let alone one stemming from a punctuation mark) is like a rare-bird sighting in the world of linguistics: an innovation in the slang of young people embedding itself as a function word in the language".

The meaning of the virgule, pronounced "slash" and written '/', has evolved into multiple contextual uses, including "distinguishing between (a) the activity that the speaker or writer was intending to do or should have been doing, and (b) the activity that the speaker or writer actually did or anticipated they would do...". 'Slash' has been used to "link a second related thought or clause to the first" as well as simply "introduc[ing] an afterthought that is also a topic shift". A few examples include:

- "I went to class slash caught up on Game of Thrones."
- "Does anyone care if my cousin comes and visit slash stays with us Friday night?"
- "Has anyone seen my moccasins anywhere? Slash were they given to someone to wear home ever?"

== Temporary and permanent usage ==
Some anthimeria is a fad or nonce usage. Other words have become permanent additions to English vocabulary, as with 'chill'. 'Slash' also appears to be developing into a permanent conjunction.

For example, for a few weeks after Clint Eastwood's speech at the 2012 Republican National Convention, Eastwooding meant talking to an empty chair, but this usage quickly disappeared.

== See also ==
- Antimetabole
- Deverbal noun
- Denominal verb
- Figure of speech
- Verbification

== General sources ==
- Baldrick, Chris. 2008. Oxford Dictionary of Literary Terms. Oxford University Press. New York. ISBN 978-0-19-920827-2.
- Corbett, Edward P. J. and Connors, Robert J. 1999. Style and Statement. Oxford University Press. New York, Oxford. ISBN 0-19-511543-0.
- Forsyth, Mark. 2014. The Elements of Eloquence. Berkley Publishing Group/Penguin Publishing. New York. ISBN 978-0-425-27618-1.
