= Denominal verb =

Verb formed from a noun

In grammar, denominal verbs are verbs derived from nouns. Many languages have regular morphological indicators to create denominal verbs.

== English ==
English examples are to school, from school, meaning to instruct; to shelve, from shelf, meaning to put on shelves; and to symbolize, from symbol, meaning to be a symbol for.

Some common denominalizing affixes in English are -ize/-ise (e.g., summarize), -ify (e.g., classify), -ate (e.g., granulate), en- (e.g., enslave), be- (e.g., behead), and zero or -∅ (e.g., school).

A variety of semantic relations are expressed between the base noun X and the derived verb. Although there is no simple relationship between the affix and the semantic relation, there are semantic regularities that can define certain subclasses. Such subclasses include:

- resultative: to make something into an X, e.g., victimize, cash
- locative: to put something in X, e.g., box, hospitalize
- instrumental: to use X, e.g., sponge, hammer
- ablative: to remove something from X, e.g., deplane, unsaddle
- privative: to remove X from something, e.g., pit (olives), behead, bone, defrost
- ornative: to add X to something or to cover something with X, e.g., rubberize, salt
- similative: to act like or resemble X, e.g., tyrannize, guard
- performative: to do or perform X, e.g., botanize, tango

== Rgyalrong ==
In Rgyalrong languages, denominal derivations are extremely developed and have given rise to incorporating and antipassive constructions.

== Latin ==
Many Latin verbs are denominal. For example, the first conjugation verb nominare (to name) is derived from nomen (a name), and the fourth conjugation verb mollire (to soften) derives from the adjective mollis (soft).

== Hebrew ==
Denominal verb derivation is highly productive in Hebrew. They are derived from denominal roots and mostly get a set of pi'el, pu'al and hitpa'el binyans, but can accept others as well. Only active pi'el binyan is shown here:

- מַחְשֵׁב (makhshev - computer) -> מִחְשֵׁב (mikhshev - computerize);
- סִפְרָתִי/סִפְרָה (sifra/sifrati - digit/digital) -> סִפְרֵת (sifret - digitize);
- תַּמְצִית (tamtzit - extract, summary) -> תִּמְצֵת (timtzet - summarize);
- מַפָּה (mapa - map) -> מִפָּה (mipa - map).

Some roots derive verbs from more than one binyan set:

- מָקוֹם (makom - place) -> מִקֵּם (mikem - place, locate), הִמְקִים (himkim - localize).

== See also ==
- Deverbal noun, where the noun is formed from the verb.
