= Verbal noun =

Noun formed from or otherwise corresponding to a verb

Historically, grammarians have described a verbal noun or gerundial noun as a verb form that functions as a noun. An example of a verbal noun in English is 'sacking' as in the sentence "The sacking of the city was an epochal event" (wherein sacking is a gerund form of the verb sack).

A verbal noun, as a type of nonfinite verb form, is a term that some grammarians still use when referring to gerunds, gerundives, supines, and nominal forms of infinitives. In English however, verbal noun has most frequently been treated as a synonym for gerund.

Aside from English, the term verbal noun may apply to:

- the citation form of verbs such as the masdar in Arabic and the verbal noun (berfenw) in Welsh
- declinable verb forms in Mongolian that can serve as predicates, comparable to participles but with a larger area of syntactic use

== Types ==
Verbal nouns, whether derived from verbs or constituting an infinitive, behave syntactically as grammatical objects or grammatical subject. They may also be used as count nouns and pluralized but cannot be inflected vis-a-vis a given grammatical person.

In English, gerunds used as verbal nouns comprise the suffix -ing. Examples of such uses are given below:

Killing the president was an atrocious crime.
He was chastised for not leaving a tip for the server.
Creating a backup file might be a good idea.
Thanks for giving us a heads-up.

Infinitives used as verbal nouns generally occur as prefaced by the particle to:

To be or not to be is the question.
To become a U.S. president, one must be a natural born U.S. citizen.
Try to stay calm.
Finding time to exercise requires proper planning.

Infinitives used as verbal nouns may not be prefaced by the particle to, however, when elided via ellipsis:

Having proper contacts might help you (to) get the job.
They couldn't help but (to) notice and (to) snicker at the wardrobe malfunction.

Verbs also may be nominalized through derivational processes, such as suffixes (as in discovery from the verb discover) or by simple conversion (as with the noun love from the verb love). The formation of such deverbal nouns is not generally a productive process, that is, it cannot be indiscriminately applied to form nouns from any verb (for example, there is no noun *uncovery for the verb uncover). When they exist, such deverbal nouns often tend to replace the regularly formed verbal noun (as discovery is usually used rather than discovering, although the latter is still common as a gerund), or else a differentiation in meaning becomes established.

=== Other Languages ===
Verbal nouns (also known as masdars) are common in the Northeast Caucasian languages, such as Archi, Budukh, Lezgian, and Hinuq. They are typically formed with a suffix, and can take gender and number suffixes

Example from Lezgian:

čna wi ašpazwili-n alaq'-un-r.i-z qimet gu-zwa
we.ERG you.GEN cooking-GEN able-MSD-PL-DAT price give-IMPF
"We appreciate your cooking skills"

== See also ==
- Deverbal noun
