= Conversion (word formation) =

Grammatical process of a lexeme changing part of speech

In linguistics, conversion, also called zero derivation or null derivation, is a kind of word formation involving the creation of a word (of a new part of speech) from an existing word (of a different part of speech) without any change in form, which is to say, derivation using only zero. For example, the noun green in golf (referring to a putting-green) is derived ultimately from the adjective green.

Conversions from adjectives to nouns and vice versa are both very common and unnotable in English; much more remarked upon is the creation of a verb by converting a noun or other word (for example, the adjective clean becomes the verb to clean).

== Verbification ==
Verbification, or verbing, is the creation of a verb from a noun, adjective or other word.

=== In English ===
In English, verbification typically involves simple conversion of a non-verb to a verb. The verbs to verbify and to verb, the first by derivation with an affix and the second by zero derivation, are themselves products of verbification (see autological word), and the term to verb is often used more specifically, to refer only to verbification that does not involve a change in form. (Verbing in that specific sense is therefore a kind of anthimeria.)

Many adjectives have become verbs, including adjectives based on Latin passive participles, such as "separate". Usually, at least now, there is a pronunciation difference between the adjective and the verb. (Later this was extended to forming verbs from Latin passive participles even if they were not used as adjectives.)

Examples of verbification in the English language number in the thousands, including some of the most common words such as mail and e-mail, strike, salt, pepper, switch, bed, sleep, ship, train, stop, drink, cup, lure, mutter, dress, dizzy, divorce, fool, merge, to be found throughout the dictionary. Thus, verbification is by no means confined to slang and has furnished English with countless new expressions: "access", as in "access the file", which was previously only a noun, as in "gain access to the file". Similar mainstream examples include "host", as in "host a party", and "chair", as in "chair the meeting". Other formations, such as "gift", are less widespread but still mainstream.

Verbification is a common source of neologisms which can meet opposition from prescriptivist authorities (the verb sense of impact is a well-known example).

However, many such words have become accepted parts of the language after extended use.

In many cases, the verbs were distinct from their noun counterparts in Old English, and regular sound change has made them the same form: these can be reanalysed as conversion.

=== In constructed languages ===
In Toki Pona, any content word may function as a noun, verb or adjective depending on syntax; for example, moku may mean food, to eat, or edible.

== Noun conversion in English ==
Many English nouns are formed from unmodified verbs: a fisherman's catch, to go for a walk, etc. A modern case of noun conversion through zero derivation in slang from popular culture might be seen in cringe, in the noun sense of "awkwardness, inducement of second-hand embarrassment".

Nounification in jargon-heavy fields such as information technology is prevalent:

Verb	Traditional noun	IT noun
download	downloading	download
exploit	exploitation	exploit
fail	failure	fail
print	printing	print
redirect	redirection	redirect
run	execution	run
sync	synchronization	sync
update	updating	update

== Humor ==
Verbification is sometimes used to create nonce words or joking words. Often, simple conversion is involved, as with formations like beer, as in beer me ("give me a beer") and eye, as in eye it ("look at it"), although "to eye" in Nigeria English is used commonly to mean "to look at disdainfully" or "to look at with disgust" . Sometimes, a verbified form can occur with a prepositional particle, e.g., sex as in sex it up ("make it sexier").

A Calvin and Hobbes strip dealing with this phenomenon concluded with the statement that "Verbing weirds language", demonstrating the verbing of both verb and weird. (The former appears in its use as a gerund.)
