= Supine =

Form of verbal noun used in some languages

In grammar, a supine is a form of verbal noun used in some languages. The term is most often used for Latin, where it is one of the four principal parts of a verb.

The word also refers to a position of lying on one's back (as opposed to 'prone', lying face downward), but there exists no widely accepted etymology that explains why or how the term came to be used to also describe this form of a verb.

== Latin ==
There are two supines, I (first) and II (second). They are originally the accusative and dative or ablative forms of a verbal noun in the fourth declension, respectively.

=== First supine ===
The first supine ends in -um. (Note: From the accusative form of the verbal noun -u) It has two uses.

The first use is with verbs of motion. In many cases, it indicates purpose:

- 'Mater pompam me spectatum duxit' is 'Mother took me to watch the procession'.
- 'Legati ad Caesarem gratulatum convenerunt' is 'The ambassadors came to Caesar to congratulate him'.

The translation of this first usage of the first supine is similar to, if not identical to, the Latin clause of purpose.

A second usage is in combination with the future passive infinitive. In this second usage it indicates fate; for example "occisum iri" (Note: occīd- + -tum gives occīsum) means 'to be going to be killed'. It mostly appears in indirect statements:

- ' Occisum iri a Milone video' is 'I foresee that he is going to be killed by Milo'.

=== Second supine ===
The second supine, which comes with adjectives, is rarely used; only a few verbs have been seen to commonly adopt the form. It is derived from the dative of purpose, which expresses the purpose of a thing or action, or the ablative of respect, which can translate as "with regard/respect to" and is used to indicate to what extent or in what way the main clause is true. It is the same as the first supine but replacing final -um by -ū, with a lengthened u. Mirabile dictū, for example, translates as "amazing to say", where dictū is the supine form. The sense is generally passive, even if usually not explicitly marked as such in idiomatic English translation; for example, difficile creditū, "hard to believe", is more literally "hard to be believed", or "hardly believable".

== Sanskrit ==
Sanskrit has a formation, from the accusative form of an old verbal noun, -tu. The ending -tum, much like in Latin, is added to the root.

- √dā ⇒ dā́·tum − (to give)
- √bhū- ⇒ bháv·i·tum − (to be)
- √kṛ- ⇒ kár·tum − (to do)
- √gam- ⇒ gán·tum − (to go)

== Germanic languages ==
In English grammar, the term "supine" is sometimes used to refer to the to-infinitive. The to-infinitive is seen in sentences like "To err is human; to forgive divine."

In Swedish grammar, the supine is used with an auxiliary verb to produce some compound verb forms that closely resemble perfect forms. Inspired by the tradition in Swedish grammar, some linguists identify a similar form in the Danish language.

In Icelandic grammar, sagnbót (usually translated as "supine") is a verbal form identical to the neuter participle, used to form certain verb tenses.

== Finnic languages ==
In Estonian, the supine is called "ma-tegevusnimi" (lit. "ma-infinitive") because all the words in supine have "ma" in the end (as in "tegema", "jooksma", "kõndima"), and they act similarly to the Latin example. The supine is also the common dictionary form for verbs. The Finnish equivalent of the Estonian supine in "-ma" is called "kolmannen infinitiivin illatiivi" (lit. "the illative of the third infinitive"), which is "-maan" or "-mään" according to vowel harmony (as in "tekemään", "juoksemaan", "kävelemään"), these, too, act similarly to the Latin as they are complements of verbs of motion.

== Romance languages ==
In Romanian, the supine generally corresponds to an English construction like for [gerund]: "Această carte este de citit" means "This book is for reading". Additionally, the supine in Romanian can be used to express English constructions such as “I have things to do,” which would be translated as “Am lucruri de făcut.”

== Slavic languages ==
The Slovene and the Lower Sorbian supine is used after verbs of movement; see Slovenian verbs. The supine was used in Proto-Slavic but it was replaced in most Slavic languages by the infinitive in later periods. Old Czech used supine until the 14th century. Kajkavian has also preserved the supine.

== Baltic languages ==
In some dialects of Lithuanian, the supine is used with verbs of motion to indicate purpose: Moterys eina miestan duonos pirktų, which means "The women are going to the town to buy some bread". The standard language uses the infinitive, pirkti, instead of the supine. In Old Lithuanian, the supine was a much more widespread form than in Modern Lithuanian.

== See also ==
- Gerund
- Non-finite verb

== Bibliography ==
- Sanskrit Grammar - William Dwight Whitney - ISBN 978-81-208-0621-4
- Indo-European Language and Culture - Fortson IV, Benjamin W - 2nd Ed - Wiley-Blackwell (2010) - ISBN 978-1-4051-8896-8
- The Sanskrit Language - Burrow, T - ISBN 81-208-1767-2
