= Latin conjugation =

Latin grammatical verb inflections

In linguistics and grammar, conjugation has two basic meanings. One meaning is the creation of derived forms of a verb from basic forms, or principal parts.

The second meaning of the word conjugation is a group of verbs which all have the same pattern of inflections. Thus all those Latin verbs which in the present tense have 1st singular -ō, 2nd singular -ās, and infinitive -āre are said to belong to the 1st conjugation, those with 1st singular -eō, 2nd singular -ēs and infinitive -ēre belong to the 2nd conjugation, and so on. The number of conjugations of regular verbs is usually said to be four.

The word "conjugation" comes from the Latin coniugātiō, a calque of the Greek συζυγία (syzygia), literally "yoking together (horses into a team)".

For examples of verbs and verb groups for each inflectional class, see the Wiktionary appendix pages for first conjugation, second conjugation, third conjugation, and fourth conjugation.

== Number of conjugations ==
The ancient Romans themselves, beginning with Varro (1st century BC), originally divided their verbs into three conjugations (coniugationes verbis accidunt tres: prima, secunda, tertia "there are three different conjugations for verbs: the first, second, and third" (Donatus), 4th century AD), according to whether the ending of the 2nd person singular had an a, an e or an i in it. However, others, such as Sacerdos (3rd century AD), Dositheus (4th century AD) and Priscian (c. 500 AD), recognised four different groups.

In modern times grammarians generally recognise four conjugations according to the ending of the active infinitive: namely -āre, -ēre, -ere, or -īre, for example: (1) amō, amāre "to love", (2) videō, vidēre "to see", (3) regō, regere "to rule" and capiō, capere "to capture", (4) audiō, audīre "to hear". (3rd conjugation verbs ending in -iō such as capiō are sometimes known as "mixed conjugation" since they use a mixture of 3rd and 4th conjugation endings.)

In addition to regular verbs, which belong to one or other of the four regular conjugations, there are also a few irregular verbs, which have a different pattern of endings. The most frequent of these is the verb sum, esse "to be" together with its prefixed derivatives.

There also exist deponent Latin verbs, which though active in meaning have endings identical to the passive endings of ordinary verbs. Examples in the different conjugations are: (1) moror, morārī "to delay", (2) polliceor, pollicērī "to promise", (3) sequor, sequī "to follow" and regredior, regredī "to go back", (4) mentior, mentīrī "to lie (tell a lie)". Some verbs are semi-deponent, using passive forms for the perfect tenses only.

Latin conjugation basic paradigm
Aspect →	Imperfect						Perfect			
Voice →	Active			Passive			Active		Passive	
Mood →	Indicative	Subjunctive	Imperative	Indicative	Subjunctive	Imperative	Indicative	Subjunctive	Indicative	Subjunctive
Past	amābam: I was loving	amārem: I might love	—	amābar: I was being loved	amārer: I might be loved	—	amāveram: I had loved	amāvissem: I would have loved	amātus eram: I had been loved	amātus essem: I might have been loved
Present	amō: I am loving; I love	amem: I may love	amā: love!	amor: I am being loved; I am loved	amer: I may be loved	amāre: be loved!	amāvī: I have loved; I loved	amāverim: I might have loved	amātus sum: I have been loved	amātus sim: I may have been loved
Future	amābō: I will love	—	amātō: you should love	amābor: I will be loved	—	amātor: you should be loved	amāverō: I will have loved	—	amātus erō: I will have been loved	—

== Principal parts ==
A verb's full paradigm relies on multiple different stems. The present indicative active and the present infinitive are both based on the present stem.

It is not possible to infer the stems for other tenses from the present stem. This means that, although the infinitive active form normally shows the verb conjugation, knowledge of several different forms is necessary to be able to confidently produce the full range of forms for any particular verb.

In a dictionary, Latin verbs are listed with four "principal parts" (or fewer for deponent and defective verbs), which allow the student to deduce the other conjugated forms of the verbs. These are:

1. the first person singular of the present indicative active
2. the present infinitive active
3. the first person singular of the perfect indicative active
4. the supine or, in some grammars, the perfect passive participle, which uses the same stem. (Texts that list the perfect passive participle use the future active participle for intransitive verbs.) Some verbs lack this principal part altogether.

== Regular conjugations ==
=== First conjugation ===
The first conjugation is characterized by the vowel ā and can be recognized by the -āre ending of the present active infinitive form. The infectum tenses conjugate as follows (see also their meaning):

		Indicative			Subjunctive	
		Present	Future	Imperfect	Present	Imperfect
Active		I love	I will love	I was loving	I may love	I might love
Active	I you sg. he, she, it we you pl. they	amō amās amat amāmus amātis amant	amābō amābis amābit amābimus amābitis amābunt	amābam amābās amābat amābāmus amābātis amābant	amem amēs amet amēmus amētis ament	amārem amārēs amāret amārēmus amārētis amārent
Passive		I am loved	I will be loved	I was being loved	I may be loved	I might be loved
Passive	I you sg. he, she, it we you pl. they	amor amāris amātur amāmur amāminī amantur	amābor amāberis/e* amābitur amābimur amābiminī amābuntur	amābar amābāris/e* amābātur amābāmur amābāminī amābantur	amer amēris/e* amētur amēmur amēminī amentur	amārer amārēris/e* amārētur amārēmur amārēminī amārentur

* The 2nd person singular passive amāberis, amābāris, amēris, amārēris can be shortened to amābere, amābāre, amēre, amārēre. -re was the regular form in early Latin and (except in the present indicative) in Cicero; -ris was preferred later.

In early Latin (Plautus), the 3rd singular endings -at and -et were pronounced -āt and -ēt with a long vowel.

Other forms:

- Infinitive: amāre "to love"
- Passive infinitive: amārī "to be loved" (in early Latin often amārier)
- Imperative: amā! (pl. amāte!) "love!"
- Future imperative: amātō! (pl. amātōte!) "love! (at a future time)"
- Indirect imperative: amātō! (pl. amantō!) "let him love!"
- Passive imperative: amāre! (pl. amāminī!) "be loved!" (usually only found in deponent verbs)
- Passive future imperative: amātor! (pl. amātōminī!) "be loved! (at a future time)"
- Passive indirect imperative: amātor! (pl. amantor!) "let him be loved!"
- Present participle: amāns (pl. amantēs) "loving"
- Future participle: amātūrus (pl. amātūrī) "going to love"
- Gerundive: amandus (pl. amandī) "needing to be loved"
- Gerund: amandī "of loving", amandō "by/for loving", ad amandum "in order to love"

The principal parts usually adhere to one of the following patterns:

- The perfect has the suffix -āvī. The majority of first-conjugation verbs follow this pattern, which is considered to be "regular", for example:
  - amō, amāre, amāvī, amātum, "to love";
  - imperō, imperāre, imperāvī, imperātum, "to order";
  - laudō, laudāre, laudāvī, laudātum, "to praise";
  - negō, negāre, negāvī, negātum, "to deny";
  - nūntiō, nūntiāre, nūntiāvī, nūntiātum, "to announce, report";
  - ōrō, ōrāre, ōrāvī, ōrātum, "to beg, pray";
  - parō, parāre, parāvī, parātum, "to prepare";
  - portō, portāre, portāvī, portātum, "to carry";
  - pugnō, pugnāre, pugnāvī, pugnātum, "to fight";
  - putō, putāre, putāvī, putātum, "to think";
  - rogō, rogāre, rogāvī, rogātum, "to ask";
  - servō, servāre, servāvī, servātum, "to save";
  - vocō, vocāre, vocāvī, vocātum, "to call";
- The perfect has the suffix -uī, for example:
  - fricō, fricāre, fricuī, frictum, "to rub";
  - secō, secāre, secuī, sectum, "to cut, to divide";
  - vetō, vetāre, vetuī, vetitum, "to forbid, to prohibit";
- The perfect has the suffix -ī and vowel lengthening in the stem, for example:
  - iuvō, iuvāre, iūvī, iūtum, "to help, to assist";
  - lavō, lavāre, lāvī, lautum, "to wash, to bathe";
- The perfect is reduplicated, for example:
  - dō, dare, dedī, datum, "to give"
  - stō, stāre, stetī, statum, "to stand";

The verb dō "I give" is irregular in that except in the 2nd singular dās and imperative dā, the a is short, e.g. dabō "I will give".

The a is also short in the supine statum and its derivatives, but the other parts of stō "I stand" are regular.

Deponent verbs in this conjugation all follow the pattern below, which is the passive of the first type above:

- arbitror, arbitrārī, arbitrātus sum "to think"
- cōnor, cōnārī, cōnātus sum "to try"
- cūnctor, cūnctārī, cūnctātus sum "to hesitate"
- hortor, hortārī, hortātus sum "to exhort"
- mīror, mīrārī, mīrātus sum "to be surprised, to be amazed at"
- moror, morārī, morātus sum "to delay, stay"

==== Perfect tenses ====
The three perfectum tenses of the 1st conjugation go as in the following table:

		Indicative			Subjunctive	
		Perfect	Future perfect	Pluperfect	Perfect	Pluperfect
Active		I loved	I will have loved	I had loved	I loved	I had loved
Active	I you sg. he, she, it we you pl. they	amāvī amāvistī amāvit amāvimus amāvistis amāvērunt/-ēre*	amāverō amāverīs/is amāverit amāverīmus/-imus amāverītis/-itis amāverint	amāveram amāverās amāverat amāverāmus amāverātis amāverant	amāverim amāverīs amāverit amāverīmus amāverītis amāverint	amā(vi)ssem* amāvissēs amāvisset amāvissēmus amāvissētis amāvissent
Passive		I was loved	I will have been loved	I had been loved	I was loved	I had been loved
Passive	I you sg. he, she, it we you pl. they	amātus sum amātus es amātus est amātī sumus amātī estis amātī sunt	amātus erō amātus eris amātus erit amātī erimus amātī eritis amātī erunt	amātus eram amātus erās amātus erat amātī erāmus amātī erātis amātī erant	amātus sim amātus sīs amātus sit amātī sīmus amātī sītis amātī sint	amātus essem amātus essēs amātus esset amātī essēmus amātī essētis amātī essent

In poetry (and also sometimes in prose, e.g. Livy), the 3rd person plural of the perfect indicative is often amāvēre instead of amāvērunt. Occasionally the form amāverunt is also found.

In early Latin, the future perfect indicative had a short i in amāveris, amāverimus, amāveritis, but by the time of Cicero these forms were usually pronounced with a long i, in the same way as in the perfect subjunctive. Virgil has a short i for both tenses; Horace uses both forms for both tenses; Ovid uses both forms for the future perfect, but a long i in the perfect subjunctive.

The -v- of the perfect active tenses sometimes drops out, especially in the pluperfect subjunctive: amāssem for amāvissem. Forms such as amārat and amāstī are also found.

The passive tenses also have feminine and neuter forms, e.g. amāta est "she was loved", nūntiātum est "it was announced".

Forms made with fuī instead of sum and forem instead of essem are also found, for example amātus fuī, amātus fuerō, amātus forem and so on, but these are not common in classical Latin. See Latin tenses.

For other meanings of the perfect and pluperfect subjunctive, see Latin tenses#Jussive subjunctive.

Other forms:

- Perfect infinitive active: amāvisse (amāsse) "to have loved"
- Perfect infinitive passive: amātus esse (amātum esse) "to have been loved"
- Perfect participle passive: amātus, -a, -um "loved (by someone)"

=== Second conjugation ===
The second conjugation is characterized by the vowel ē, and can be recognized by the -eō ending of the first person present indicative and the -ēre ending of the present active infinitive form:

		Indicative			Subjunctive	
		Present	Future	Imperfect	Present	Imperfect
Active		I see	I will see	I was seeing	I may see	I might see
Active	I you sg. he, she, it we you pl. they	videō vidēs videt vidēmus vidētis vident	vidēbō vidēbis vidēbit vidēbimus vidēbitis vidēbunt	vidēbam vidēbās vidēbat vidēbāmus vidēbātis vidēbant	videam videās videat videāmus videātis videant	vidērem vidērēs vidēret vidērēmus vidērētis vidērent
Passive		I am seen	I will be seen	I was being seen	I may be seen	I might be seen
Passive	I you sg. he, she, it we you pl. they	videor vidēris vidētur vidēmur vidēminī videntur	vidēbor vidēberis/e vidēbitur vidēbimur vidēbiminī vidēbuntur	vidēbar vidēbāris/e vidēbātur vidēbāmur vidēbāminī vidēbantur	videar videāris/e videātur videāmur videāminī videantur	vidērer vidērēris/e vidērētur vidērēmur vidērēminī vidērentur

The passive videor also often means "I seem".

Other forms:

- Infinitive: vidēre "to see"
- Passive infinitive: vidērī "to be seen"
- Imperative: vidē! (pl. vidēte!) "see!"
- Future imperative: vidētō! (pl. vidētōte!) "see! (at a future time)"
- Passive imperative: vidēre! (pl. vidēminī!) "be seen!" (usually only found in deponent verbs)
- Present participle: vidēns (pl. videntēs) "seeing"
- Future participle: vīsūrus (pl. vīsūrī) "going to see"
- Gerundive: videndus (pl. videndī) "needing to be seen"
- Gerund: videndī "of seeing", videndō "by /for seeing", ad videndum "in order to see"

The principal parts usually adhere to one of the following patterns:

- The perfect has the suffix -uī. Verbs which follow this pattern are considered to be "regular". Examples:
  - dēbeō, dēbēre, dēbuī, dēbitum "to owe, be obliged"
  - doceō, docēre, docuī, doctum "to teach, to instruct"
  - iaceō, iacēre, iacuī, iacitum "to lie (on the ground/bed)"
  - mereō, merēre, meruī, meritum "to deserve"
  - misceō, miscēre, miscuī, mixtum "to mix"
  - moneō, monēre, monuī, monitum "to warn, advise"
  - noceō, nocēre, nocuī, nocitum "to be harmful"
  - praebeō, praebēre, praebuī, praebitum "to provide, show"
  - teneō, tenēre, tenuī, tentum "to hold, to keep"
  - terreō, terrēre, terruī, territum "to frighten, to deter"
  - timeō, timēre, timuī, – "to fear"
  - valeō, valēre, valuī, (valitum) "to be strong"
- The perfect has the suffix –ēvī. Example:
  - dēleō, dēlēre, dēlēvī, dēlētum "to destroy"
  - fleō, flēre, flēvī, flētum "to weep"

In verbs with perfect in -vī, syncopated (i.e. abbreviated) forms are common, such as dēlēram, dēlēssem, dēlēstī for dēlēveram, dēlēvissem, dēlēvistī.

- The perfect has the suffix –īvī. Example:
  - cieō, ciēre, cīvī, citum "to arouse, to stir"
- The perfect has the suffix -sī (which combines with a preceding c or g to –xī). Examples:
  - ārdeō, ārdēre, ārsī, ārsum "to burn"
  - augeō, augēre, auxī, auctum "to increase, to enlarge"
  - haereō, haerēre, haesī, haesum "to stick, to adhere, to get stuck"
  - iubeō, iubēre, iussī, iussum "to order"
  - maneō, manēre, mānsī, mānsum "to remain"
  - persuādeō, persuādēre, persuāsī, persuāsum "to persuade"
  - rīdeō, rīdēre, rīsī, rīsum "to laugh"
- The perfect is reduplicated with -ī. Examples:
  - mordeō, mordēre, momordī, morsum "to bite"
  - spondeō, spondēre, spopondī, spōnsum "to vow, to promise"
- The perfect has suffix -ī and vowel lengthening in the stem. Examples:
  - caveō, cavēre, cāvī, cautum "to be cautious"
  - faveō, favēre, fāvī, fautum "to favour"
  - foveō, fovēre, fōvī, fōtum "to caress, to cherish"
  - sedeō, sedēre, sēdī, sessum "to sit"
  - videō, vidēre, vīdī, vīsum "to see"
- The perfect has suffix -ī. Examples:
  - respondeō, respondēre, respondī, respōnsum "to reply"
  - strīdeō, strīdēre, strīdī, – "to hiss, to creak" (also strīdō 3rd conj.)

Deponent verbs in this conjugation are few. They mostly go like the passive of terreō, but fateor and confiteor have a perfect participle with ss:

- fateor, fatērī, fassus sum "to confess"
- mereor, merērī, meritus sum "to deserve"
- polliceor, pollicērī, pollicitus sum "to promise"

The following are semi-deponent, that is, they are deponent only in the three perfect tenses:

- audeō, audēre, ausus sum "to dare"
- gaudeō, gaudēre, gāvīsus sum "to rejoice, to be glad"
- soleō, solēre, solitus sum "to be accustomed"

=== Third conjugation ===
The third conjugation has a variable short stem vowel, which may be e, i, or u in different environments. Verbs of this conjugation end in -ere in the present active infinitive. Deponent verbs have the infinitive -ī.

		Indicative			Subjunctive	
		Present	Future	Imperfect	Present	Imperfect
Active		I lead	I will lead	I was leading	I may lead	I might lead
Active	I you sg. he, she, it we you pl. they	dūcō dūcis dūcit dūcimus dūcitis dūcunt	dūcam dūcēs dūcet dūcēmus dūcētis dūcent	dūcēbam dūcēbās dūcēbat dūcēbāmus dūcēbātis dūcēbant	dūcam dūcās dūcat dūcāmus dūcātis dūcant	dūcerem dūcerēs dūceret dūcerēmus dūcerētis dūcerent
Passive		I am led	I will be led	I was being led	I may be led	I might be led
Passive	I you sg. he, she, it we you pl. they	dūcor dūceris dūcitur dūcimur dūciminī dūcuntur	dūcar dūcēris/re dūcētur dūcēmur dūcēminī dūcentur	dūcēbar dūcēbāris/re dūcēbātur dūcēbāmur dūcēbāminī dūcēbantur	dūcar dūcāris/re dūcātur dūcāmur dūcāminī dūcantur	dūcerer dūcerēris/re dūcerētur dūcerēmur dūcerēminī dūcerentur

The future tense in the 3rd and 4th conjugation (-am, -ēs, -et etc.) differs from that in the 1st and 2nd conjugation (-bō, -bis, -bit etc.).

Other forms:

- Infinitive: dūcere "to lead"
- Passive infinitive: dūcī "to be led" (the 3rd conjugation has no r)
- Imperative: dūc! (pl. dūcite!) "lead!"
- Future imperative: dūcitō! (pl. dūcitōte!) "lead! (at a future time)"
- Passive imperative: dūcere! (pl. dūciminī!) "be led!" (usually only found in deponent verbs)
- Present participle: dūcēns (pl. dūcentēs) "leading"
- Future participle: ductūrus (pl. ductūrī) "going to lead"
- Gerundive: dūcendus (pl. dūcendī) "needing to be led"
- Gerund: dūcendī "of leading", dūcendō "by /for leading", ad dūcendum "in order to lead"

Four 3rd conjugation verbs usually have no ending in the imperative singular: dūc! "lead!", dīc! "say!", fer! "bring!", fac! "do!".

Others, like curre "run!", have the ending -e.

There is no regular rule for constructing the perfect stem of third-conjugation verbs, but the following patterns are used:

- The perfect has suffix -sī (-xī when c, g, or h comes at the end of the root). Examples:
  - carpō, carpere, carpsī, carptum "to pluck, to select"
  - cēdō, cēdere, cessī, cessum "to yield, depart"
  - claudō, claudere, clausī, clausum "to close"
  - contemnō, contemnere, contempsī, contemptum "to despise, disdain, treat with contempt"
  - dīcō, dīcere, dīxī, dictum "to say"
  - dīvidō, dīvidere, dīvīsī, dīvīsum "to divide"
  - dūcō, dūcere, dūxī, ductum "to lead"
  - flectō, flectere, flexī, flexum "to bend, to twist"
  - gerō, gerere, gessī, gestum "to wear, to bear; wage (war)"
  - mittō, mittere, mīsī, missum "to send"
  - regō, regere, rēxī, rēctum "to rule"
  - scrībō, scrībere, scrīpsī, scrīptum "to write"
  - tegō, tegere, tēxī, tēctum "to cover, conceal"
  - trahō, trahere, trāxī, trāctum "to drag, to pull"
  - vīvō, vīvere, vīxī, vīctum "to live"
- The perfect is reduplicated with suffix –ī. Examples:
  - cadō, cadere, cecidī, cāsum "to fall"
  - caedō, caedere, cecīdī, caesum "to kill, to slay"
  - currō, currere, cucurrī, cursum "to run, to race"
  - discō, discere, didicī, – "to learn"
  - fallō, fallere, fefellī, falsum "to cheat"
  - pēdō, pēdere, pepēdī, pēditum "to fart"
  - pellō, pellere, pepulī, pulsum "to beat, to drive away"
  - pōscō, pōscere, popōscī, – "to claim, request"
  - tangō, tangere, tetigī, tāctum "to touch, to hit"
  - tendō, tendere, tetendī, tentum/tēnsum "to stretch"

Although dō, dare, dedī, datum "to give" is 1st conjugation, its compounds are 3rd conjugation and have internal reduplication:

- condō, condere, condidī, conditum "to found"
- crēdō, crēdere, crēdidī, crēditum "to entrust, believe"
- dēdō, dēdere, dēdidī, dēditum "to surrender"
- perdō, perdere, perdidī, perditum "to destroy, lose"
- reddō, reddere, reddidī, redditum "to give back"
- trādō, trādere, trādidī, trāditum "to hand over"

Likewise the compounds of sistō have internal reduplication. Although sistō is transitive, its compounds are intransitive:

- sistō, sistere, (stitī), statum "to cause to stand"
- cōnsistō, cōnsistere, cōnstitī, cōnstitum "to come to a halt"
- dēsistō, dēsistere, dēstitī, dēstitum "to stand off"
- resistō, resistere, restitī, restitum "to resist"

- The perfect has suffix -vī. Examples:
  - linō, linere, lēvī (līvī), litum "to smear, to daub" (also 4th conj. liniō, linīre, līvī, lītum)
  - petō, petere, petīvī, petītum "to seek, to attack"
  - quaerō, quaerere, quaesīvī, quaesītum "to look for, ask"
  - serō, serere, sēvī, satum "to sow, to plant"
  - sternō, sternere, strāvī, strātum "to spread, to stretch out"
  - terō, terere, trīvī, trītum "to rub, to wear out"
- The perfect has suffix -ī and vowel lengthening in the stem. If the present stem has an n infix, as in fundō, relinquō and vincō, the infix disappears in the perfect. In some cases, the long vowel in the perfect is thought to be derived from an earlier reduplicated form, e.g. *e-agī > ēgī, *e-emī > ēmī. Examples:
  - agō, agere, ēgī, āctum "to do, to drive"
  - cōgō, cōgere, coēgī, coāctum "to compel, gather together"
  - emō, emere, ēmī, ēmptum "to buy"
  - fundō, fundere, fūdī, fūsum "to pour"
  - legō, legere, lēgī, lēctum "to collect, to read"
  - relinquō, relinquere, relīquī, relictum "to leave behind"
  - rumpō, rumpere, rūpī, ruptum "to burst"
  - vincō, vincere, vīcī, victum "to conquer, to defeat"
- The perfect has suffix -ī only. Examples:
  - ascendō, ascendere, ascendī, ascēnsum "to climb, to go up"
  - cōnstituō, cōnstituere, cōnstituī, cōnstitūtum "to establish, decide, cause to stand"
  - dēfendō, dēfendere, dēfendī, dēfēnsum "to defend"
  - expellō, expellere, expulī, expulsum "to drive out, expel"
  - īcō, īcere, īcī, ictum "to strike"
  - metuō, metuere, metuī, metūtum "to fear, be apprehensive"
  - occīdō, occīdere, occīdī, occīsum "to kill"
  - ostendō, ostendere, ostendī, ostentum (ostensum) "to show"
  - tollō, tollere, sustulī, sublātum "to lift, raise, remove"
  - vertō, vertere, vertī, versum "to turn"
  - vīsō, vīsere, vīsī, vīsum "to visit"
- The perfect has suffix –uī. Examples:
  - colō, colere, coluī, cultum "to cultivate, to till"
  - cōnsulō, cōnsulere, cōnsuluī, cōnsultum "to consult, act in the interests of"
  - gignō, gignere, genuī, genitum "to beget, to cause"
  - molō, molere, moluī, molitum "to grind"
  - pōnō, pōnere, posuī, positum "to place"
  - texō, texere, texuī, textum "to weave, to plait"
  - vomō, vomere, vomuī, vomitum "to vomit"
- The present tense indicative first person singular form has suffix –scō. Examples:
  - adolēscō, adolēscere, adolēvī, adultum "to grow up, to mature"
  - nōscō, nōscere, nōvī, nōtum "to get to know, to learn"
  - pāscō, pāscere, pāvī, pāstum "to feed upon, to feed (an animal)"
  - quiēscō, quiēscere, quiēvī, quiētum "to rest, keep quiet"

Deponent verbs in the 3rd conjugation include the following:

- complector, complectī, complexus sum "to embrace"
- fruor, fruī, frūctus sum "to enjoy" (fruitus is occasionally found)
- fungor, fungī, fūnctus sum "to perform, discharge, busy oneself with"
- lābor, lābī, lāpsus sum "to glide, slip"
- loquor, loquī, locūtus sum "to speak"
- nītor, nītī, nīxus sum "to lean on; to strive" (nīsus is occasionally found)
- queror, querī, questus sum "to complain"
- sequor, sequī, secūtus sum "to follow"
- ūtor, ūtī, ūsus sum "to use"
- vehor, vehī, vectus sum "to ride"

There are also a number of 3rd conjugation deponents with the ending -scor:

- adipīscor, adipīscī, adeptus sum "to obtain"
- īrāscor, īrāscī, īrātus sum "to get angry"
- nancīscor, nancīscī, nactus sum "to obtain"
- nāscor, nāscī, nātus sum "to be born"
- oblīvīscor, oblīvīscī, oblītus sum "to forget"
- proficīscor, proficīscī, profectus sum "to set out"
- ulcīscor, ulcīscī, ultus sum "to avenge, take vengeance on"

Deponent in some tenses only is the following:

- fīdō, fīdere, fīsus sum "to trust"

The following is deponent only in the infectum tenses:

- revertor, revertī, revertī "to turn back"

==== Third conjugation -iō verbs ====
Intermediate between the third and fourth conjugation are the third-conjugation verbs with suffix –iō. These resemble the fourth conjugation in some forms.

		Indicative			Subjunctive	
		Present	Future	Imperfect	Present	Imperfect
Active		I capture	I will capture	I was capturing	I may capture	I might capture
Active	I you sg. he, she, it we you pl. they	capiō capis capit capimus capitis capiunt	capiam capiēs capiet capiēmus capiētis capient	capiēbam capiēbās capiēbat capiēbāmus capiēbātis capiēbant	capiam capiās capiat capiāmus capiātis capiant	caperem caperēs caperet caperēmus caperētis caperent
Passive		I am captured	I will be captured	I was being captured	I may be captured	I might be captured
Passive	I you sg. he, she, it we you pl. they	capior caperis capitur capimur capiminī capiuntur	capiar capiēris/re capiētur capiēmur capiēminī capientur	capiēbar capiēbāris/re capiēbātur capiēbāmur capiēbāminī capiēbantur	capiar capiāris/re capiātur capiāmur capiāminī capiantur	caperer caperēris/re caperētur caperēmur caperēminī caperentur

Other forms:

- Infinitive: capere "to capture, to take"
- Passive infinitive: capī "to be captured" (the 3rd conjugation has no r)
- Imperative: cape! (pl. capite!) "capture!"
- Future imperative: capitō! (pl. capitōte!) "capture! (at a future time)"
- Passive imperative: capere! (pl. capiminī!) "be captured!" (usually only found in deponent verbs)
- Future passive imperative: capitor! (pl. capitōminī!) "be captured! (at a future time)" (usually only found in deponent verbs)
- Present participle: capiēns (pl. capientēs) "capturing"
- Future participle: captūrus (pl. captūrī) "going to capture"
- Gerundive: capiendus (pl. capiendī) "needing to be captured" (capiundus is also sometimes found)
- Gerund: capiendī "of capturing", capiendō "by /for capturing", ad capiendum "in order to capture"

Some examples are:

- accipiō, accipere, accēpī, acceptum "to receive, accept"
- capiō, capere, cēpī, captum "to take, capture"
- cōnspiciō, cōnspicere, cōnspexī, cōnspectum "to watch, examine"
- cupiō, cupere, cupīvī, cupītum "to desire, long for"
- faciō, facere, fēcī, factum "to do, to make"
- fugiō, fugere, fūgī, fugitum "to flee"
- iaciō, iacere, iēcī, iactum "to throw"
- interficiō, interficere, interfēcī, interfectum "to kill"
- rapiō, rapere, rapuī, raptum "to plunder, seize"
- respiciō, respicere, respexī, respectum "to look back"

Deponent verbs in this group include:

- aggredior, aggredī, aggressus sum "to attack"
- ēgredior, ēgredī, ēgressus sum "to go out"
- morior, morī, mortuus sum "to die"
- patior, patī, passus sum "to suffer, to allow"
- prōgredior, prōgredī, prōgressus sum "to attack"
- regredior, regredī, regressus sum "to go back"

There are various verbs that display variation between third conjugation iō-forms and fourth conjugation endings, such as orior ("to arise, be born"), for which both the third conjugation form oritur and the fourth conjugation form orīrī are attested.

=== Fourth conjugation ===
The fourth conjugation is characterized by the vowel ī and can be recognized by the -īre ending of the present active infinitive. Deponent verbs have the infinitive -īrī:

		Indicative			Subjunctive	
		Present	Future	Imperfect	Present	Imperfect
Active		I hear	I will hear	I was hearing	I may hear	I might hear
Active	I you sg. he, she, it we you pl. they	audiō audīs audit audīmus audītis audiunt	audiam audiēs audiet audiēmus audiētis audient	audiēbam audiēbās audiēbat audiēbāmus audiēbātis audiēbant	audiam audiās audiat audiāmus audiātis audiant	audīrem audīrēs audīret audīrēmus audīrētis audīrent
Passive		I am heard	I will be heard	I was being heard	I may be heard	I might be heard
Passive	I you sg. he, she, it we you pl. they	audior audīris audītur audīmur audīminī audiuntur	audiar audiēris/re audiētur audiēmur audiēminī audientur	audiēbar audiēbāris/re audiēbātur audiēbāmur audiēbāminī audiēbantur	audiar audiāris/re audiātur audiāmur audiāminī audiantur	audīrer audīrēris/re audīrētur audīrēmur audīrēminī audīrentur

Irregular fourth-conjugation future forms such as scībis and scībō are attested, albeit rarely, in Old Latin writers such as Plautus. The majority of attested b-futures in both authors belong to specifically the verb sciō ("to know"). In Plautus, 21 of all 46 examples of such future forms belong to the paradigm of sciō, and likewise, in Terence, 7 of the 11 attested b-futures belong to the verb sciō. This particular type of future is probably not more archaic than the standard future forms such as audiēt. It was instead likely an innovation of archaic Latin that briefly saw some success, but ultimately failed to displace the regular future forms and eventually died out. There is also evidence of Old Latin fourth conjugation imperfect forms such as servībās instead of the more regular Classical form serviēbās. This type of imperfect became extraordinarily rare in later Language, leading many copyists throughout history to misunderstand such forms as mere errors and adjust them to the expected Classical paradigm. For instance, all manuscripts of Terence's The Woman of Andros present the unmetrical form serviēbās instead of the correct form servībās. In contrast to the b-future, this unique type of b-imperfect was very common in the writings of Plautus and Terence, both of whom used it more frequently than the imperfect in -iēbam. Both types of unique imperfect and future forms only survived into the Classical period as specifically poetic forms only used when the regular word did not fit the meter. For example, Propertius utilizes a form lēnībunt and Ovid uses audībat, both of which appear in situations where the Classical form would be unmetrical.

Other forms:

- Infinitive: audīre "to hear"
- Passive infinitive: audīrī "to be heard"
- Imperative: audī! (pl. audīte!) "hear!"
- Future imperative: audītō! (pl. audītōte!) "hear! (at a future time)"
- Passive imperative: audīre! (pl. audīminī!) "be heard!" (usually only found in deponent verbs)
- Present participle: audiēns (pl. audientēs) "hearing"
- Future participle: audītūrus (pl. audītūrī) "going to hear"
- Gerundive: audiendus (pl. audiendī) "needing to be heard"
- Gerund: audiendī "of hearing", audiendō "by /for hearing", ad audiendum "in order to hear"

Principal parts of verbs in the fourth conjugation generally adhere to the following patterns:

- The perfect has suffix -vī. Verbs which adhere to this pattern are considered to be "regular". Examples:
  - audiō, audīre, audīvī, audītum "to hear, listen (to)"
  - custōdiō, custōdīre, custōdīvī, custōdītum "to guard"
  - dormiō, dormīre, dormīvī (dormiī), dormītum "to sleep"
  - impediō, impedīre, impedīvī, impedītum "to hinder, impede"
  - mūniō, mūnīre, mūnīvī, mūnītum "to fortify, to build"
  - pūniō, pūnīre, pūnīvī, pūnītum "to punish"
  - sciō, scīre, scīvī, scītum "to know"
- The perfect has suffix -uī. Examples:
  - aperiō, aperīre, aperuī, apertum "to open, to uncover"
- The perfect has suffix -sī (-xī when c comes at the end of the root). Examples:
  - saepiō, saepīre, saepsī, saeptum "to surround, to enclose"
  - sanciō, sancīre, sānxī, sānctum "to confirm, to ratify"
  - sentiō, sentīre, sēnsī, sēnsum "to feel, to perceive"
  - vinciō, vincīre, vīnxī, vīnctum "to bind"
- The perfect has suffix -ī and reduplication. Examples:
  - reperiō, reperīre, repperī, repertum "to find, discover"
- The perfect has suffix -ī and vowel lengthening in the stem. Examples:
  - veniō, venīre, vēnī, ventum "to come, to arrive"
  - inveniō, invenīre, invēnī, inventum "to find"

Deponent verbs in the 4th conjugation include the following:

- assentior, assentīrī, assēnsus sum "to assent"
- experior, experīrī, expertus sum "to experience, test"
- largior, largīrī, largītus sum "to bestow"
- mentior, mentīrī, mentītus sum "to tell a lie"
- mētior, mētīrī, mēnsus sum "to measure"
- mōlior, mōlīrī, mōlītus sum "to exert oneself, set in motion, build"
- potior, potīrī, potītus sum "to obtain, gain possession of"
- sortior, sortīrī, sortītus sum "to cast lots"

The verb orior, orīrī, ortus sum "to arise" is also regarded as 4th conjugation, although some parts, such as the 3rd singular present tense oritur and imperfect subjunctive orerer, have a short vowel like the 3rd conjugation. But its compound adorior "to rise up, attack" is entirely 4th conjugation.

In the perfect tenses, shortened forms without -v- are common, for example, audīstī, audiērunt, audierat, audīsset for audīvistī, audīvērunt, audīverat, audīvisset. Cicero, however, prefers the full forms audīvī, audīvit to audiī, audiit.

== Irregular verbs ==
=== Sum and possum ===
The verb sum, esse, fuī "to be" is the most common verb in Latin. It is conjugated as follows:

		Indicative			Subjunctive	
		Present	Future	Imperfect	Present	Imperfect
Active		I am	I will be	I was	I may be	I might be
Active	I you sg. he, she, it we you pl. they	sum es est sumus estis sunt	erō eris erit erimus eritis erunt	eram erās erat erāmus erātis erant	sim sīs sit sīmus sītis sint	essem essēs esset essēmus essētis essent
Active		I am able	I will be able	I was able	I may be able	I might be able
Active	I you sg. he, she, it we you pl. they	possum potes potest possumus potestis possunt	poterō poteris poterit poterimus poteritis poterunt	poteram poterās poterat poterāmus poterātis poterant	possim possīs possit possīmus possītis possint	possem possēs posset possēmus possētis possent

In early Latin (e.g. Plautus), siem, siēs, siet can be found for the present subjunctive sim, sīs, sit. In poetry the subjunctive fuam, fuās, fuat also sometimes occurs.

An alternative imperfect subjunctive is sometimes made using forem, forēs, foret etc. See further: Latin tenses#Foret.

Other forms:

- Infinitive: esse "to be", posse "to be able"
- Perfect infinitive: fuisse "to have been", potuisse "to have been able"
- Future infinitive: fore "to be going to be" (also futūrus esse)
- Imperative: es! (pl. este!) "be!"
- Future imperative: estō! (pl. estōte!) "be! (at a future time)"
- Future participle: futūrus (pl. futūrī) "going to be" (Possum has no future participle or future infinitive.)

The present participle is found only in the compounds absēns "absent" and praesēns "present".

In Plautus and Lucretius, an infinitive potesse is sometimes found for posse "to be able".

The principal parts of these verbs are as follows:

- sum, esse, fuī "to be"
- absum, abesse, āfuī "to be away"
- adsum, adesse, adfuī "to be present"
- dēsum, dēesse, dēfuī "to be wanting"
- possum, posse, potuī "to be able"
- prōsum, prōdesse, prōfuī "to be for, to profit" (adds d before a vowel)

The perfect tenses conjugate in the regular way.

For the difference in meaning between eram and fuī, see Latin tenses#Difference between eram and fuī

=== Volō, nōlō, and mālō ===
The verb volō and its derivatives nōlō and mālō (short for magis volō) resemble a 3rd conjugation verb, but the present subjunctive ending in -im is different:

		Indicative			Subjunctive	
		Present	Future	Imperfect	Present	Imperfect
Active		I want	I will want	I was wanting	I may want	I might want
Active	I you sg. he, she, it we you pl. they	volō vīs vult volumus vultis volunt	volam volēs volet volēmus volētis volent	volēbam volēbās volēbat volēbāmus volēbātis volēbant	velim velīs velit velīmus velītis velint	vellem vellēs vellet vellēmus vellētis vellent
Active		I am unwilling	I will be unwilling	I was unwilling	I may be unwilling	I might be unwilling
Active	I you sg. he, she, it we you pl. they	nōlō nōn vīs nōn vult nōlumus nōn vultis nōlunt	nōlam nōlēs nōlet nōlēmus nōlētis nōlent	nōlēbam nōlēbās nōlēbat nōlēbāmus nōlēbātis nōlēbant	nōlim nōlīs nōlit nōlīmus nōlītis nōlint	nōllem nōllēs nōllet nōllēmus nōllētis nōllent
Active		I prefer	I will prefer	I was preferring	I may prefer	I might prefer
Active	I you sg. he, she, it we you pl. they	mālō māvīs māvult mālumus māvultis mālunt	mālam mālēs mālet mālēmus mālētis mālent	mālēbam mālēbās mālēbat mālēbāmus mālēbātis mālēbant	mālim mālīs mālit mālīmus mālītis mālint	māllem māllēs māllet māllēmus māllētis māllent

The spellings volt and voltis were used up until the time of Cicero for vult and vultis.

These verbs are not used in the passive.

Other forms:

- Infinitive: velle "to want", nōlle "to be unwilling", mālle "to prefer"
- Present participle: volēns "willing", nōlēns "unwilling"
- Imperative: nōlī, pl. nōlīte (used in expressions such as nōlī mīrārī "don't be surprised!")

Principal parts:

- volō, velle, voluī "to want"
- nōlō, nōlle, nōluī "not to want, to be unwilling"
- mālō, mālle, māluī "to prefer"

The perfect tenses are formed regularly.

=== Eō and compounds ===
The verb eō "I go" is an irregular 4th conjugation verb, in which the i of the stem sometimes becomes e. Like 1st and 2nd conjugation verbs, it uses the future -bō, -bis, -bit:

		Indicative			Subjunctive	
		Present	Future	Imperfect	Present	Imperfect
Active		I go	I will go	I was going	I may go	I might go
Active	I you sg. he, she, it we you pl. they	eō īs it īmus ītis eunt	ībō ībis ībit ībimus ībitis ībunt	ībam ībās ībat ībāmus ībātis ībant	eam eās eat eāmus eātis eant	īrem īrēs īret īrēmus īrētis īrent

Other forms:

- Infinitive: īre "to go"
- Passive infinitive: īrī "to go" (used impersonally, e.g. quō īrī dēbēret ignōrantēs "not knowing which way to go")
- Imperative: ī! (pl. īte!) "go!"
- Future imperative: ītō! (pl. ītōte!) "go! (at a future time)" (rare)
- Present participle: iēns (pl. euntēs) "going"
- Future participle: itūrus (pl. itūrī) "going to go"
- Gerundive: eundum "necessary to go" (used impersonally only)
- Gerund: eundī "of going", eundō "by / for going", ad eundum "in order to go"

The impersonal passive forms ītur "they go", itum est "they went" are sometimes found.

The principal parts of some verbs which conjugate like eō are the following:

- eō, īre, iī/(īvī), itum "to go"
- abeō, abīre, abiī, abitum "to go away"
- adeō, adīre, adiī, aditum "to go up to"
- coeō, coīre, coiī, coitum "to meet, assemble"
- exeō, exīre, exiī/(exīvī), exitum "to go out"
- ineō, inīre, iniī, initum "to enter"
- intereō, interīre, interiī, interitum "to perish"
- introeō, introīre, introiī, introitum "to enter"
- pereō, perīre, periī, peritum "to die, to perish"
- praetereō, praeterīre, praeteriī, praeteritum "to pass by"
- redeō, redīre, rediī, reditum "to return, to go back"
- subeō, subīre, subiī, subitum "to go under, to approach stealthily, to undergo"
- vēneō, vēnīre, vēniī, vēnitum "to be sold"

In the perfect tenses of these verbs, the -v- is almost always omitted, especially in the compounds, although the form exīvit is common in the Vulgate Bible translation.

In some perfect forms, the vowels ii- are contracted to ī-: second person singular perfect īstī, second person plural perfect īstis; pluperfect subjunctive īssem, īssēs, ..., īssent; perfect infinitive īsse (the form iisse is also attested).

The verb queō, quīre, quiī/quīvī, quitum "to be able" has forms similar to eō.

=== Ferō and compounds ===
The verb ferō, ferre, tulī, lātum "to bring, to bear, to carry" is 3rd conjugation, but irregular in that the vowel following the root fer- is sometimes omitted. The perfect tense tulī and supine stem lātum are also irregularly formed.

		Indicative			Subjunctive	
		Present	Future	Imperfect	Present	Imperfect
Active		I bring	I will bring	I was bringing	I may bring	I might bring
Active	I you sg. he, she, it we you pl. they	ferō fers fert ferimus fertis ferunt	feram ferēs feret ferēmus ferētis ferent	ferēbam ferēbās ferēbat ferēbāmus ferēbātis ferēbant	feram ferās ferat ferāmus ferātis ferant	ferrem ferrēs ferret ferrēmus ferrētis ferrent
Passive		I am brought	I will be brought	I was being brought	I may be brought	I might be brought
Passive	I you sg. he, she, it we you pl. they	feror ferris fertur ferimur feriminī feruntur	ferar ferēris/re ferētur ferēmur ferēminī ferentur	ferēbar ferēbāris/re ferēbātur ferēbāmur ferēbāminī ferēbantur	ferar ferāris/re ferātur ferāmur ferāminī ferantur	ferrer ferrēris/re ferrētur ferrēmur ferrēminī ferrentur

The future tense in the 3rd and 4th conjugation (-am, -ēs, -et etc.) differs from that in the 1st and 2nd conjugation (-bō, -bis, -bit etc.).

Other forms:

- Infinitive: ferre "to bring"
- Passive infinitive: ferrī "to be brought"
- Imperative: fer! (pl. ferte!) "bring!"
- Passive imperative: ferre! (pl. feriminī!) "be carried!" (rare)
- Present participle: ferēns (pl. ferentēs) "bringing"
- Future participle: lātūrus (pl. lātūrī) "going to bring"
- Gerundive: ferendus (pl. ferendī) "needing to be brought"
- Gerund: ferendī "of bringing", ferendō "by /for bringing", ad ferendum "in order to bring"

Compounds of ferō include the following: The principal parts of some verbs which conjugate like ferō are the following:

- afferō, afferre, attulī, allātum "to bring (to)"
- auferō, auferre, abstulī, ablātum "to carry away, to steal"
- cōnferō, cōnferre, contulī, collātum "to collect"
- differō, differre, distulī, dīlātum "to put off"
- efferō, efferre, extulī, ēlātum "to carry out"
- offerō, offerre, obtulī, oblātum "to offer"
- referō, referre, rettulī, relātum "to refer"

The perfect tense sustulī, however, belongs to the verb tollō:

- tollō, tollere, sustulī, sublātum "to raise, to remove"

=== Fīō ===
The irregular verb fīō, fierī, factus sum "to become, to happen, to be done, to be made" as well as being a verb in its own right serves as the passive of faciō, facere, fēcī, factum "to do, to make". The perfect tenses are identical with the perfect passive tenses of faciō.

		Indicative			Subjunctive	
		Present	Future	Imperfect	Present	Imperfect
Active		I become	I will become	I was becoming	I may become	I might become
Active	I you sg. he, she, it we you pl. they	fīō fīs fit (fīmus) (fītis) fīunt	fīam fīēs fīet fīēmus fīētis fīent	fīēbam fīēbās fīēbat fīēbāmus fīēbātis fīēbant	fīam fīās fīat fīāmus fīātis fīant	fierem fierēs fieret fierēmus fierētis fierent

The 1st and 2nd plural forms are almost never found.

Other forms:

- Infinitive: fierī "to become, to be done, to happen"
- Imperative: fī! (pl. fīte!) "become!"

=== Edō ===
The verb edō, edere/ēsse, ēdī, ēsum "to eat" has regular 3rd conjugation forms appearing alongside irregular ones:

		Indicative			Subjunctive	
		Present	Future	Imperfect	Present	Imperfect
Active		I eat	I will eat	I was eating	I may eat	I might eat
Active	I you sg. he, she, it we you pl. they	edō edis, ēs edit, ēst edimus editis, ēstis edunt	edam edēs edet edēmus edētis edent	edēbam edēbās edēbat edēbāmus edēbātis edēbant	edam, edim edās, edīs edat, edit edāmus, edīmus edātis, edītis edant, edint	ederem, ēssem ederēs, ēssēs ederet, ēsset ederēmus, ēssēmus ederētis, ēssētis ederent, ēssent

Other forms:

- Infinitive: edere/ēsse "to eat"
- Passive infinitive: edī "to be eaten"
- Imperative: ede!/ēs! (pl. edite!/ēste) "eat!"
- Present participle: edēns (pl. edentēs) "eating"
- Future participle: ēsūrus (pl. ēsūrī) "going to eat"
- Gerundive: edendus (pl. edendī) "needing to be eaten"
- Gerund: edendī "of eating", edendō "by /for eating", ad edendum "in order to eat" / "for eating"

The passive form ēstur "it is eaten" is also found.

The present subjunctive edim, edīs, edit etc. is found mostly in early Latin.

In writing, there is a possibility of confusion between the forms of this verb and those of sum "I am" and ēdō "I give out, put forth"; for example, ēsse "to eat" vs. esse "to be"; edit "he eats" vs. ēdit "he gives out".

The compound verb comedō, comedere/comēsse, comēdī, comēsum "to eat up, consume" is similar.

== Non-finite forms ==
The non-finite forms of verbs are participles, infinitives, supines, gerunds and gerundives. The verbs used are:

1st conjugation: laudō, laudāre, laudāvī, laudātum – to praise
2nd conjugation: terreō, terrēre, terruī, territum – to frighten, deter
3rd conjugation: petō, petere, petīvī, petītum – to seek, attack
3rd conjugation (-i stem): capiō, capere, cēpī, captum – to take, capture
4th conjugation: audiō, audīre, audīvī, audītum – to hear, listen (to)

=== Participles ===
There are four participles: present active, perfect passive, future active, and future passive (= the gerundive).

- The present active participle is declined as a 3rd declension adjective. The ablative singular is -e, but the plural follows the i-stem declension with genitive -ium and neuter plural -ia.
- The perfect passive participle is declined like a 1st and 2nd declension adjective.
  - In all conjugations, the perfect participle is formed by removing the –um from the supine, and adding a –us (masculine nominative singular).
- The future active participle is declined like a 1st and 2nd declension adjective.
  - In all conjugations the -um is removed from the supine, and an -ūrus (masculine nominative singular) is added.
- The future passive participle, more usually called the gerundive, is formed by taking the present stem, adding "-nd-", and the usual first and second declension endings. Thus laudare forms laudandus. The usual meaning is "needing to be praised", expressing a sense of obligation.

	Participles				
	laudāre	terrēre	petere	capere	audīre
Present active	laudāns, -antis	terrēns, -entis	petēns, -entis	capiēns, -entis	audiēns, -entis
Perfect passive	laudātus, -a, -um	territus, -a, -um	petītus, -a, -um	captus, -a, -um	audītus, -a, -um
Future active	laudātūrus, -a, -um	territūrus, -a, -um	petītūrus, -a, -um	captūrus, -a, -um	audītūrus, -a, -um
Gerundive	laudandus, -a, -um	terrendus, -a, -um	petendus, -a, -um	capiendus, -a, -um	audiēndus, -a, -um

=== Infinitives ===
There are seven main infinitives. They are in the present active, present passive, perfect active, perfect passive, future active, future passive, and potential active. Further infinitives can be made using the gerundive.

- The present active infinitive is the second principal part (in regular verbs). It plays an important role in the syntactic construction of Accusative and infinitive, for instance.
  - laudāre means, "to praise."
- The present passive infinitive is formed by adding a –rī to the present stem. This is only so for the first, second and fourth conjugations. In the third conjugation, the thematical vowel, e, is taken from the present stem, and an –ī is added. There is an alternative infinitive ending -ier which appears rarely in both Old and Classical Latin. It is, however, almost entirely nonexistent during the Classical period, and was confined to archaizing poetic contexts or quotations of ancient phrases. Both types of infinitives appear in the works of Plautus and Terence, though even amongst these authors the Classical infinitive in –rī is more common, implying that the forms in -ier were already vanishing from regular language by the time of these writers. Plautus and Terence almost exclusively utilize the archaic infinitive form at line end, implying that the form was only chosen for metrical reasons. It is likely on account of metrical difficulties that there are extremely few attested third-conjugation infinitives in -ier. Iambo-trochaic lines must end in – ᴗ x sequences, and the -ier endings for first, second, and fourth conjugation verbs fit this scheme perfectly. However, for third conjugation verbs, the antepenultimate syllable can be either long or short (e.g. long as in fāriēr or short as in ăgiēr), and only in the former case does the meter fit.
  - laudārī translates as "to be praised."
  - memorārier translates as "to be told."
- The perfect active infinitive is formed by adding an –isse onto the perfect stem.
  - laudāvisse/laudāsse translates as "to have praised."
- The perfect passive infinitive uses the perfect passive participle along with the auxiliary verb esse. The perfect passive infinitive must agree with what it is describing in number, gender, and case (nominative or accusative).
  - laudātus esse means, "to have been praised."
- The future active infinitive uses the future active participle with the auxiliary verb esse.
  - laudātūrus esse means, "to be going to praise." The future active infinitive must agree with what it is describing in number, gender, and case (nominative or accusative).
  - Esse has two future infinitives: futurus esse and fore
- The future passive infinitive uses the supine with the auxiliary verb īrī. Because the first part is a supine, the ending -um does not change for gender or number.
  - laudātum īrī is translated as "to be going to be praised." This is normally used in indirect speech. For example: Spērat sē absolūtum īrī. "He hopes that he will be acquitted."
- The potential infinitive uses the future active participle with the auxiliary verb fuisse.
  - laudātūrus fuisse is used only in indirect statements to represent a potential imperfect or pluperfect subjunctive of direct speech. It is translated with "would" or "would have". For example: nōn vidētur mentītūrus fuisse, nisī dēspērāsset (Quintilian) 'it seems unlikely that he would have told a lie, if he had not been desperate'

Infinitives (with masculine endings used for participles)
	laudāre	terrēre	petere	capere	audīre
Present active	laudāre	terrēre	petere	capere	audīre
Present passive	laudārī	terrērī	petī	capī	audīrī
Perfect active	laudāvisse	terruisse	petīvisse	cēpisse	audīvisse
Perfect passive	laudātus esse	territus esse	petītus esse	captus esse	audītus esse
Future active	laudātūrus esse	territūrus esse	petītūrus esse	captūrus esse	audītūrus esse
Future passive	laudātum īrī	territum īrī	petītum īrī	captum īrī	audītum īrī
Potential	laudātūrus fuisse	territūrus fuisse	petītūrus fuisse	captūrus fuisse	audītūrus fuisse

The future passive infinitive was not very commonly used. The Romans themselves often used an alternate expression, fore ut followed by a subjunctive clause.

=== Supine ===
The supine is the fourth principal part of the verb, as given in Latin dictionaries. It resembles a masculine noun of the fourth declension. Supines only occur in the accusative and ablative cases.

- The accusative form ends in a –um, and is used with a verb of motion in order to show purpose. Thus it is only used with verbs like īre "to go", venīre "to come", etc. The accusative form of a supine can also take an object if needed.
  - Pater līberōs suōs laudātum vēnit. – The father came to praise his children.
- The ablative, which ends in a –ū, is used with the Ablative of Specification.
  - Arma haec facillima laudātū erant. – These arms were the easiest to praise.

	Supine				
	laudāre	terrēre	petere	capere	audīre
Accusative	laudātum	territum	petītum	captum	audītum
Ablative	laudātū	territū	petītū	captū	audītū

=== Gerund ===
The gerund is formed similarly to the present active participle. However, the -ns becomes an -ndus, and the preceding ā or ē is shortened. Gerunds are neuter nouns of the second declension, but the nominative case is not present. The gerund is a noun, meaning "the act of doing (the verb)", and forms a suppletive paradigm to the infinitive, which cannot be declined. For example, the genitive form laudandī can mean "of praising", the dative form laudandō can mean "for praising", the accusative form laudandum can mean "praising", and the ablative form laudandō can mean "by praising", "in respect to praising", etc.

	Gerund				
	laudāre	terrēre	petere	capere	audīre
Accusative	laudandum	terrendum	petendum	capiendum	audiendum
Genitive	laudandī	terrendī	petendī	capiendī	audiendī
Dative	laudandō	terrendō	petendō	capiendō	audiendō
Ablative	laudandō	terrendō	petendō	capiendō	audiendō

One common use of the gerund is with the preposition ad to indicate purpose. For example, paratus ad oppugnandum could be translated as "ready to attack". However the gerund was avoided when an object was introduced, and a passive construction with the gerundive was preferred. For example, for "ready to attack the enemy" the construction paratus ad hostes oppugnandos is preferred over paratus ad hostes oppugnandum.

=== Gerundive ===
The gerundive has a form similar to that of the gerund, but it is a first and second declension adjective, and functions as a future passive participle (see § Participles above). It means "(which is) to be ...ed". Often, the gerundive is used with part of the verb esse, to show obligation.

- Puer laudandus est "The boy needs to be praised"
- Oratio laudanda est means "The speech is to be praised". In such constructions a substantive in dative may be used to identify the agent of the obligation (dativus auctoris), as in Oratio nobis laudanda est meaning "The speech is to be praised by us" or "We must praise the speech".

Gerundive
laudāre	terrēre	petere	capere	audīre
laudandus, -a, -um	terrendus, -a, -um	petendus, -a, -um	capiendus, -a, -um	audiendus, -a, -um

An older form of the 3rd and 4th conjugation gerundive ends in -undum, e.g. (faciundum for faciendum). This ending is also found with the gerundive of eō 'I go': eundum est 'it is necessary to go'.

For some examples of uses of Latin gerundives, see the Gerundive article.

== Periphrastic conjugations ==
There are two periphrastic conjugations. One is active, and the other is passive.

=== Active ===
The first periphrastic conjugation uses the future participle. It is combined with the forms of esse. It is translated as "I am going to praise", "I was going to praise", etc.

	Conjugation	Translation
Pres. ind.	laudātūrus sum	I am going to praise
Imp. ind.	laudātūrus eram	I was going to praise
Fut. ind.	laudātūrus erō	I shall be going to praise
Perf. ind.	laudātūrus fuī	I have been going to praise
Plup. ind.	laudātūrus fueram	I had been going to praise
Fut. perf. ind.	laudātūrus fuerō	I shall have been going to praise
Pres. subj.	laudātūrus sim	I may be going to praise
Imp. subj.	laudātūrus essem	I should be going to praise
Perf. subj.	laudātūrus fuerim	I may have been going to praise
Plup. subj.	laudātūrus fuissem	I should have been going to praise

=== Passive ===
The second periphrastic conjugation uses the gerundive. It is combined with the forms of esse and expresses necessity. It is translated as "I am needing to be praised", "I was needing to be praised", etc., or as "I have to (i.e., must) be praised", "I had to be praised", etc. It may also be translated in English word by word, as in "You are to be (i.e., must be) praised."

	Conjugation	Translation
Pres. ind.	laudandus sum	I am needing to be praised
Imp. ind.	laudandus eram	I was needing to be praised
Fut. ind.	laudandus erō	I will be needing to be praised
Perf. ind.	laudandus fuī	I was needing to be praised
Plup. ind.	laudandus fueram	I had been needing to be praised
Fut. perf. ind.	laudandus fuerō	I will have been needing to be praised
Pres. subj.	laudandus sim	I may be needing to be praised
Imp. subj.	laudandus essem	I should be needing to be praised
Perf. subj.	laudandus fuerim	I may have been needing to be praised
Plup. subj.	laudandus fuissem	I should have been needing to be praised
Pres. inf.	laudandus esse	To be needing to be praised
Perf. inf.	laudandus fuisse	To have been needing to be praised

== Peculiarities ==
=== Deponent and semi-deponent verbs ===
Deponent verbs are verbs that are passive in form (that is, conjugated as though in the passive voice) but active in meaning. These verbs have only three principal parts, since the perfect of ordinary passives is formed periphrastically with the perfect participle, which is formed on the same stem as the supine. Some examples coming from all conjugations are:

1st conjugation: mīror, mīrārī, mīrātus sum – to admire, wonder
2nd conjugation: polliceor, pollicērī, pollicitus sum – to promise, offer
3rd conjugation: loquor, loquī, locūtus sum – to speak, say
4th conjugation: mentior, mentīrī, mentītus sum – to tell a lie

Deponent verbs use active conjugations for tenses that do not exist in the passive: the gerund, the supine, the present and future participles and the future infinitive. They cannot be used in the passive themselves (except the gerundive), and their analogues with "active" form do not in fact exist: one cannot directly translate "The word is said" with any form of loquī, and there are no forms like loquō, loquis, loquit, etc.

Semi-deponent verbs form their imperfective aspect tenses in the manner of ordinary active verbs; but their perfect tenses are built periphrastically like deponents and ordinary passives; thus, semi-deponent verbs have a perfect active participle instead of a perfect passive participle. An example:

audeō, audēre, ausus sum – to dare, venture

Unlike the proper passive of active verbs, which is always intransitive, some deponent verbs are transitive, which means that they can take an object. For example:

hostes sequitur. – he follows the enemy.

Note: In the Romance languages, which lack deponent or passive verb forms, the Classical Latin deponent verbs either disappeared (being replaced with non-deponent verbs of a similar meaning) or changed to a non-deponent form. For example, in Spanish and Italian, mīrārī changed to mirar(e) by changing all the verb forms to the previously nonexistent "active form", and audeō changed to osar(e) by taking the participle ausus and making an -ar(e) verb out of it (note that au went to o).

=== Defective verbs ===
Defective verbs are verbs that are conjugated in only some instances.

- Some verbs are conjugated only in the perfective aspect's tenses, yet have the imperfective aspect's tenses' meanings. As such, the perfect becomes the present, the pluperfect becomes the imperfect, and the future perfect becomes the future. Therefore, the defective verb ōdī means "I hate." These defective verbs' principal parts are given in vocabulary with the indicative perfect in the first person and the perfect active infinitive. Some examples are:

ōdī, ōdisse (future participle ōsūrus) – to hate
meminī, meminisse (imperative mementō, mementōte) – to remember
coepī, coeptum, coepisse – to have begun

- A few verbs, the meanings of which usually have to do with speech, appear only in certain occurrences.

Cedo (plur. cette), which means "Hand it over" is only in the imperative mood, and only is used in the second person.

The following are conjugated irregularly:

==== Aio ====
	Conjugation of aiō						
	Indicative present		Indicative imperfect		Subjunctive present		Imperative present
	Singular	Plural	Singular	Plural	Singular	Plural	Singular
First person	aiō	—	aiēbam	aiēbāmus	—	—	—
Second person	ais	—	aiēbās	aiēbātis	aiās	—	ai
Third person	ait	aiunt	aiēbat	aiēbant	aiat	aiant	—

Present Active Participle: – aiēns, aientis

==== Inquam ====
	Conjugation of inquam				
	Present indicative		Future indicative	Perfect indicative	Imperfect indicative
	Singular	Plural	Singular	Singular	Singular
First person	inquam	inquimus	—	inquiī	—
Second person	inquis	inquitis	inquiēs	inquistī	—
Third person	inquit	inquiunt	inquiet	inquit	inquiēbat

==== For ====
	Conjugation of for						
	Present indicative		Future indicative	Perfect indicative	Pluperfect indicative	Present imperative	
	Singular	Plural	Singular	Singular	Singular	Singular	Plural
First person	for	—	fābor	fātus sum	fātus eram	—	—
Second person	—	—	—	—	—	fāre	fāminī
Third person	fātur	fantur	fābitur	—	—	—	—

Present Active Participle – fāns, fantis
Present Active Infinitive – fārī (variant: fārier)
Supine – (acc.) fātum, (abl.) fātū
Gerund – (gen.) fandī, (dat. and abl.) fandō, no accusative
Gerundive – fandus, –a, –um

The Romance languages lost many of these verbs, but others (such as ōdī) survived but became regular fully conjugated verbs (in Italian, odiare).

=== Impersonal verbs ===
Impersonal verbs are those lacking a person. In English impersonal verbs are usually used with the neuter pronoun "it" (as in "It seems", or "it is raining"). Latin uses the third person singular. These verbs lack a fourth principal part. A few examples are:

pluit, pluere, plūvit/pluit – to rain (it rains)
ningit, ningere, ninxit – to snow (it snows)
oportet, oportēre, oportuit – to be proper (it is proper, one should/ought to)
licet, licēre, licuit – to be permitted [to] (it is allowed [to])

=== Irregular future active participles ===
The future active participle is normally formed by removing the –um from the supine, and adding a –ūrus. However, some deviations occur.

Present active infinitive	Supine	Future active participle	Meaning
iuvāre	iūtum	iuvātūrus	going to help
lavāre/lavere	lavātum (but PPP lautus)	lavātūrus	going to wash
parere	partum	paritūrus	going to produce
ruere	rutum	ruitūrus	going to fall
secāre	sectum	secātūrus	going to cut
fruī	frūctum/fruitum	fruitūrus	going to enjoy
nāscī	nātum	nātūrus/nascitūrus	going to be born
morī	mortuum	moritūrus	going to die
orīrī	ortum	oritūrus	going to rise

=== Alternative verb forms ===
Several verb forms may occur in alternative forms (in some authors these forms are fairly common, if not more common than the canonical ones):

- The ending –ris in the passive voice may be –re as in:

laudābāris → laudābāre

- The ending –ērunt in the perfect may be –ēre (primarily in poetry) as in:

laudāvērunt → laudāvēre

- The ending –ī in the passive infinitive may be –ier as in:

laudārī → laudārier, dicī → dicier

=== Syncopated verb forms ===
Like in most Romance languages, syncopated forms and contractions are present in Latin. They may occur in the following instances:

- Perfect stems that end in a –v may be contracted when inflected.

laudāvisse → laudāsse
laudāvistī → laudāstī
laudāverant → laudārant
laudāvisset → laudāsset

- The compounds of nōscere (to learn) and movēre (to move, dislodge) can also be contracted.

nōvistī → nōstī
nōvistis → nōstis
commōveram → commōram
commōverās → commōrās

== See also ==
- Grammatical conjugation
- Latin declension
- Latin tenses
- Romance copula
- William Whitaker's Words

== Bibliography ==
- Bennett, Charles Edwin (1918). New Latin Grammar.
- de Melo, Wolfgang (2023), "Morphology and Syntax", in Chahoud, Anna; Pezzini, Giuseppe; Adams, J. N. (eds.), Early Latin: Constructs, Diversity, Reception, Cambridge: Cambridge University Press, pp. 100–117, ISBN 978-1-108-47658-4
- Gildersleeve, B.L. & Gonzalez Lodge (1895). Gildersleeve's Latin Grammar. 3rd Edition. (Macmillan)
- J.B. Greenough; G.L. Kittredge; A.A. Howard; Benj. L. D'Ooge, eds. (1903). Allen and Greenough's New Latin Grammar for Schools and College. Ginn and Company.
- Sihler, Andrew L. (1995), New Comparative Grammar of Greek and Latin, Oxford University Press, ISBN 0-19-508345-8
