= Gerundive =

Latin verb form that functions as an adjective

In Latin grammar, a gerundive (/dʒəˈrʌndɪv/) is a verb form that functions as a verbal adjective.

In Classical Latin, the gerundive has the same form as the gerund, but is distinct from the present active participle. In Late Latin, the differences were largely lost, resulting in a form derived from the gerund or gerundive but functioning more like a participle. The adjectival gerundive form survives in the formation of progressive aspect forms in Italian, Spanish and Brazilian Portuguese and some southern/insular dialects of European Portuguese. In French the adjectival gerundive and participle forms merged completely, and the term gérondif is used for adverbial use of -ant forms.

There is no true equivalent to the gerundive in English, but it can be interpreted as a future passive participle, used adjectivally or adverbially; the closest translation is a passive to-infinitive non-finite clause such as books to be read. That reflects the most common use of the Latin gerundive, to combine a transitive verb (such as read) and its object (such as books), usually with a sense of obligation. Another translation is the recent development of the must- prefix as in a must-read book.

== Latin ==
=== Form ===
The Latin gerundive is a form of the verb. It is composed of:

- the infectum stem (the stem used to form present and imperfect tense forms)
- a vowel appropriate to the verb class or conjugation of the verb
- the suffix -nd-
- an adjectival inflectional ending

For example:

laud-	-a-	-nd-	-us, -a, -um	First conjugation	laudandus, -a, -um	'concerned with the act of praising'	homo laudandus est— 'the man is to be praised'
tim-	-e-	-nd-	-us, -a, -um	Second conjugation	timendus, -a, -um	'concerned with the act of fearing'	mulier timenda est — 'the woman is to be feared'
leg-	-e-	-nd-	-us, -a, -um	Third conjugation	legendus, -a, -um	'concerned with the act of reading'	volumen legendum est — 'the volume is to be read'
capi-	-e-	-nd-	-us, -a, -um	Third conjugation	capiendus, -a, -um	'concerned with the act of taking'	castra capienda sunt — 'the camp is to be taken'
audi-	-e-	-nd-	-us, -a, -um	Fourth conjugation	audiendus, -a, -um	'concerned with the act of hearing'	voces audiendae sunt — 'the voices are to be heard'

Related gerund forms are composed in a similar way with nominal inflexional endings.

=== Meaning and use ===
In principle, the gerundive could express a wide range of meaning relationships: 'capable of', 'prone to', 'ripe for' (killing, dying, rising, rolling etc.). Some gerundives have much the same meaning as present participles: secundus 'following'; oriundus 'arising, descended from'; volvendus 'rolling'. Originally it could express active or passive meaning, and therefore could be used with verbs in intransitive as well as transitive use. However, the great majority of gerundive forms were used with passive meaning of transitive verbs.

The gerundive could be used as either a predicative or an attributive adjective. However, attributive use was rare, largely confined to verbs expressing approval or disapproval. The predicative use invited a secondary meaning of obligation (a meaning not shared with the gerund). Thus:

ATTRIBUTIVE	agnus caedundus	'a lamb ready for slaughtering'
PREDICATIVE	agnus est caedundus	'The lamb is for slaughter', 'The lamb is to be slaughtered', 'The lamb must be slaughtered'

This sense of obligation with passive meaning is by far the most common use of the gerundive. Thus it has been equated with a future passive participle.

A neuter form without a noun may function as an impersonal expression, for example: addendum 'something to be added'; referendum 'something to be referred back'. These are not gerund forms; the -um form of the gerund is used only after prepositions. The plural forms without nouns such as agenda 'things to be done' are also adjectival gerundives; the gerund has no plural form.

For details of the formation and usage of the Latin gerundive, see Latin conjugation § Gerundive and Latin syntax § The gerundive.

=== Gerundive expressions widely quoted or adopted in English ===
- Cato the Elder, a Roman senator, frequently ended his speeches with the statement Ceterum censeo Carthaginem delendam esse ("I also think Carthage to be [something] that must be destroyed", i.e. "Besides which, I think Carthage must be destroyed").
- nunc est bibendum (Horace, Odes, 1.37) "now it is necessary to drink!", in other words, it is time to celebrate.
- Mutatis mutandis, "changing [only] those things which need to be changed" or more simply "[only] the necessary changes having been made".
- A gerundive appears in the phrase quod erat demonstrandum ("which was to be demonstrated"), whose abbreviated form Q.E.D. is often used after the final conclusion of a proof.
- The motto Nil desperandum 'Nothing is to be despaired at' i.e. 'Never despair'. Based on this the cod Latin Nil illegitimis carborundum 'Don't let the bastards grind you down'.
- The name Amanda is the feminine gerundive of amare ("to love"), and thus means roughly "[she who is] to be loved", "worthy of being loved", "worthy of love", or simply "lovable". Similarly with the name Miranda; mirari means "to admire", so the name means "[she who is] to be admired", "worthy of admiration", or "admirable".
- A number of English words come from Latin gerundives. For example, addendum comes from the gerundive of addere ("to add"), and so means something that must be added; referendum comes from the gerundive of referre ("to bring back" [to the people]); agenda comes from the neuter plural of agendus, the gerundive of agere "to do", and so means things that must be done; reverend comes from the gerundive reverendus, and refers to a person who should be revered; propaganda comes from a Neo-Latin phrase containing a feminine form of propagandus, the gerundive of propagare ("to propagate"), so that propaganda was originally something that should be propagated; legend in Latin is legenda, which originally meant things you should read, (from legere "to read") but became a (fem. sing.) word in its own right in medieval times; a dividend is something to be divided [among shareholders].
- The expression de gustibus non est disputandum ("matters of taste should not be debated").

=== Later developments ===
In Late Latin, the distinction between gerundive and future participle was sometimes lost. So, gerundive moriendi is found for morituri 'about to die'. Conversely, future participles recepturus and scripturus are found for recipiendus and scribendus/scribundus. More regularly, the gerundive came to be used as a future passive participle. Ultimately the gerundive in the nominative case came to substitute for the present participle.

== Other languages ==
The term is occasionally used in descriptions of English grammar, to denote the present participle used adjectivally or adverbially e.g. 'take a running jump'. That form, ending in -ing, is identical to that of the English gerund, but it is generally called a gerund when it is used as a noun, not as an adjective or adverb e.g. 'running burns more calories than walking'.

In Old Irish, a form known in the literature as the verbal of necessity is used as the predicate of the copula in the function of the Latin gerundive, e.g. inna hí atá adamraigthi "the things that are to be admired".

The term gerundive may be used in grammars and dictionaries of Pali, for example the Pali Text Society's Pali–English Dictionary of 1921–25. It is referred to by some other writers as the participle of necessity, the potential participle or the future passive participle. It is used with the same meaning as the Latin gerundive.

In the east African Semitic language Tigrinya, gerundive is used to denote a particular finite verb form, not a verbal adjective or adverb. Generally, it denotes completed action that is still relevant. A verb in the gerundive can be used alone or serially with another gerundive verb. In the latter case, it may sometimes be translated with an adverbial clause: bitri hidju kheydu (literally, "a-stick he-took-hold-of he-began-walking") means "while holding a stick, he is walking", i.e. "he is carrying a stick".
