= Finite verb =

Verb form that can complete an independent clause by itself

A finite verb is a verb that contextually complements a subject, which can be either explicit (like in the English indicative) or implicit (like in null subject languages or the English imperative). A finite transitive verb or a finite intransitive verb can function as the root of an independent clause. Finite verbs are distinguished from non-finite verbs such as infinitives, participles, gerunds, etc.

== History ==
The term finite is derived from Latin: finitus (past participle of finire – "to put an end to, bound, limit") as the form "to which number and person appertain". Verbs were originally said to be finite if their form limited the possible person and number of the subject.

More recently, finite verbs have been construed as any verb that independently functions as a predicate verb or one that marks a verb phrase in a predicate. Under the first of those constructions, finite verbs often denote grammatical characteristics such as gender, person, number, tense, aspect, mood, modality, and voice. In the second of those constructions, a modal verb or a certain type of auxiliary verb also may function as a finite verb. Modal verbs and auxiliary verbs mark the abovementioned characteristics to varying degrees or not at all depending on the category from which verbs are drawn.

== Examples ==
In the following sentences, the finite verbs are emphasized, while the non-finite verb forms are underlined.

Verbs appear in almost all sentences.
This sentence is illustrating finite and non-finite verbs.
The dog will have to be trained well.
Tom promised to try to do the work.
The case has been intensively examined today.
What did they want to have done about that?
Someone tried to refuse to accept the offer.
Coming downstairs, she saw the man running away.
I am trying to get the tickets.

In many languages (including English), there can be one finite verb at the root of each clause (unless the finite verbs are coordinated), whereas the number of non-finite verb forms can reach up to five or six, or even more, e.g.

He was believed to have been told to have himself examined.

Finite verbs can appear in dependent clauses as well as independent clauses:

John said that he enjoyed reading.
Something you make yourself seems better than something you buy.

Most types of verbs can appear in finite or non-finite form (and sometimes these forms may be identical): for example, the English verb go has the finite forms go, goes, and went, and the non-finite forms go, going and gone. The English modal verbs (can, could, will, etc.) are defective and lack non-finite forms.

It might seem that every grammatically complete sentence or clause must contain a finite verb. However, sentences lacking a finite verb were quite common in the old Indo-European languages, and still occur in many present-day languages. The most important type of these are nominal sentences. Another type are sentence fragments described as phrases or minor sentences. In Latin and some Romance languages, there are a few words that can be used to form sentences without verbs, such as Latin ecce, Portuguese eis, French voici and voilà, and Italian ecco, all of these translatable as here ... is or here ... are. Some interjections can play the same role. Even in English, utterances that lack a finite verb are common, e.g. Yes., No., Bill!, Thanks., etc.

A finite verb is generally expected to have a subject, as it does in all the examples above, although null-subject languages allow the subject to be omitted. For example, in the Latin sentence cogito ergo sum ("I think therefore I am") the finite verbs cogito and sum appear without an explicit subject – the subject is understood to be the first-person personal pronoun, and this information is marked by the way the verbs are inflected. In English, finite verbs lacking subjects are normal in imperative sentences:

Come over here!
Don't look at him!

And also occur in some fragmentary utterances with an elliptical subject:

[It] Doesn't matter.
[I] Don't want to go.

== Grammatical categories ==
The relatively limited system of inflectional morphology in English often obscures the central role of finite verbs. In other languages, finite verbs are the locus of much grammatical information. Depending on the language, finite verbs can inflect for the following grammatical categories:

- Gender, i.e. masculine, feminine or neuter.
- Person, e.g. 1st, 2nd, or 3rd (I/we, you, he/she/it/they).
- Number, e.g. singular or plural (or dual).
- Tense, i.e. present, past or future.
- Aspect, e.g. perfect, perfective, progressive, etc.
- Mood, e.g. indicative, subjunctive, imperative, optative, etc.
- Voice, i.e. active, middle, or passive.

The first three categories represent agreement information that the finite verb gets from its subject (by way of subject–verb agreement). The other four categories serve to situate the clause content according to time in relation to the speaker (tense), extent to which the action, occurrence, or state is complete (aspect), assessment of reality or desired reality (mood), and relation of the subject to the action or state (voice).

Modern English is an analytic language (Old English is frequently presented as a synthetic language), which means it has limited ability to express the categories by verb inflection, and it often conveys such information periphrastically, using auxiliary verbs. In a sentence such as

Sam laughs a lot,

the verb form agrees in person (3rd) and number (singular) with the subject, by means of the -s ending, and this form also indicates tense (present), aspect ("simple"), mood (indicative) and voice (active). However, most combinations of the categories need to be expressed using auxiliaries:

Sam will have been examined by this afternoon.

Here the auxiliaries will, have and been express respectively future time, perfect aspect and passive voice. (See English verb forms.) Highly inflected languages like Latin and Russian, however, frequently express most or even all of the categories in one finite verb.

== Theories of syntax ==
Finite verbs play a particularly important role in syntactic analyses of sentence structure. In many phrase structure grammars for instance those that build on the X-bar schema, the finite verb is the head of the finite verb phrase and so it is the head of the entire sentence. Similarly, in dependency grammars, the finite verb is the root of the entire clause and so is the most prominent structural unit in the clause. That is illustrated by the following trees:

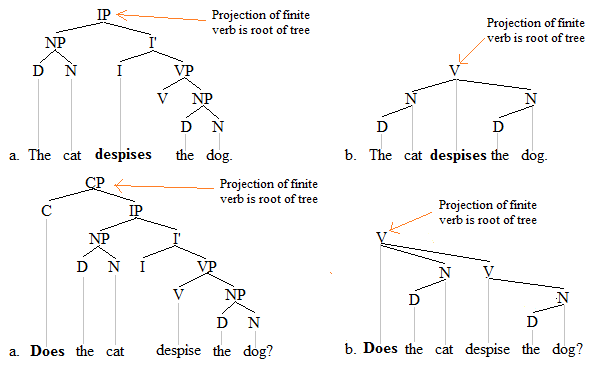

The phrase structure grammar trees are the a-trees on the left; they are similar to the trees produced in the government and binding framework. The b-trees on the right are the dependency grammar trees. Many of the details of the trees are not important for the point at hand, but they show clearly that the finite verb (in bold each time) is the structural center of the clause. In the phrase structure trees, the highest projection of the finite verb, IP (inflection phrase) or CP (complementizer phrase), is the root of the entire tree. In the dependency trees, the projection of the finite verb (V) is the root of the entire structure.

== See also ==
- Nonfinite verb
- Conjugation
- Dependency grammar
- Phrase
- Phrase structure grammar
- Verb phrase

== Sources ==
- Greenbaum, S. and R. Quirk. 1990. A student's grammar of the English language. Harlow, Essex, England: Longman.
- Cowper, E. 2009. A concise introduction to syntactic theory: The government-binding approach. Chicago: The University of Chicago Press.
- Downing, A. and P. Locke. 1992. English grammar: A university course, second edition. London: Routledge.
- Eroms, H.-W. 2000. Syntax der deutschen Sprache. Berlin: de Gruyter.
- Finch, G. 2000. Linguistic terms and concepts. New York: St. Martin's Press.
- Fortson, B. 2004. Indo-European Language and Culture. Blackwell Publishing.
- Haegeman, L. 1994. Introduction to government and binding theory, 2nd edition. Oxford, UK: Blackwell.
- Klammer, T. and M. Schulz. 1996. Analyzing English grammar. Boston: Allyn and Bacon.
- Oxford English Dictionary 1795. "finite [...] Of a verb: limited by number and person.
- Quirk, R. S. Greenbaum, G. Leech, and J. Svartvik. 1979. A grammar of contemporary English. London: Longman.
- Radford, A. 1997. Syntactic theory and the structure of English: A minimalist approach. Cambridge, UK: Cambridge University Press.
