= Deverbal noun =

Grammar term

Deverbal nouns are nouns that are derived from verbs or verb phrases.

== Formation ==
=== Hausa ===
Verbal nouns and deverbal nouns are distinct syntactic word classes. Functionally, deverbal nouns operate as autonomous common nouns, while verbal nouns retain verbal characteristics.

=== French ===
There are two connotations of the deverbal nouns: one formed without any suffix (e.g. demander → une demande), or any noun descending from a verb (e.g. dévier → une déviation).

== See also ==
- Denominal verb
- Gerund
- Verbal noun
