= Gerund =

Nonfinite verb form

In linguistics, a gerund (/ˈdʒɛrənd, -ʌnd/ abbreviated ger) is any of various nonfinite verb forms in various languages; most often, but not exclusively, it is one that functions as a noun. The name is derived from Late Latin gerundium, meaning "which is to be carried out". In English, the gerund has the properties of both verb and noun, such as being modifiable by an adverb and being able to take a direct object. The term "-ing form" is often used in English to refer to the gerund specifically. Traditional grammar makes a distinction within -ing forms between present participles and gerunds, a distinction that is not observed in such modern grammars as A Comprehensive Grammar of the English Language and The Cambridge Grammar of the English Language.

== Traditional use ==
The Latin gerund, in a restricted set of syntactic contexts, denotes the sense of the verb in isolation after certain prepositions, and in certain uses of the genitive, dative, and ablative cases. It is very rarely combined with a dependent sentence element such as an object. To express such concepts, the construction with the adjectival gerundive is preferred. By contrast, the term gerund has been used in the grammatical description of other languages to label verbal nouns used in a wide range of syntactic contexts and with a full range of clause elements.

Thus, English grammar uses gerund to mean an -ing form used in non-finite clauses such as playing on computers. This is not a normal use for a Latin gerund. Moreover, the clause may function within a sentence as subject or object, which is impossible for a Latin gerund.

- Playing on computers is fun. (-ing clause as subject)
- I like playing on computers (-ing clause as object)

The contrast with the Latin gerund is also clear when the clause consists of a single word.

- Computing is fun. ("gerund" as subject)
- I like computing ("gerund" as object)

Latin never uses the gerund in this way, but instead uses the infinitive.

Traditional English grammar distinguishes non-finite clauses used as above from adverbial use, adjective-like modification of nouns, and use in finite progressive (continuous) forms

- Playing on computers, they whiled the day away.
- The boys playing on computers are my nephews.
- They are always playing on computers.

In these uses playing is traditionally labelled a participle.

Traditional grammar also distinguishes -ing forms with exclusively noun properties as in

I work in that building	contrast "gerund"	I like building things
That is a good painting	contrast "gerund"	I like painting pictures
Her writing is good	contrast "gerund"	I like writing novels

The objection to the term gerund in English grammar is that -ing forms are frequently used in ways that do not conform to the clear-cut three-way distinction made by traditional grammar into gerunds, participles and nouns.

== Latin gerund ==
=== Form ===
The Latin gerund is a form of the verb. It is composed of:

- the infectum stem (the stem used to form present and imperfect tense forms)
- a vowel appropriate to the verb class or conjugation of the verb
- the suffix -nd-
- a nominal inflectional ending

For example,

laud-	-a-	-nd-	-um, -ī, -ō	First conjugation	laudandum	'the act of praising'
mon-	-e-	-nd-	-um, -ī, -ō	Second conjugation	monendum	'the act of warning'
leg-	-e-	-nd-	-um, -ī, -ō	Third conjugation	legendum	'the act of reading'
capi-	-e-	-nd-	-um, -ī, -ō	Third conjugation	capiendum	'the act of taking'
audi-	-e-	-nd-	-um, -ī, -ō	Fourth conjugation	audiendum	'the act of hearing'

Related gerundive forms are composed in a similar way with adjectival inflexional endings.

=== Function ===
The four inflections are used for a limited range of grammatical functions

Case	Function	Example	Translation	Notes
Nominative	Subject	no example		infinitive used
Accusative	Object	no example		infinitive used
Accusative	After preposition	canes alere ad venandum	'to rear dogs for hunting'	after ad, in, ob and occasionally other prepositions
Genitive	Modifying abstract noun	pugnandi tempus	'time for (lit. of) fighting'	nouns include occasio, tempus, causa, gratia
Dative	Expressing purpose	auscultando operam dare	'apply effort to listening'	after verbs, e.g., studeo, operam dare and adjectives, e.g., natus, optimus
Ablative	Instrumental	pugnando cepimus	'we took by fighting'	became undistinguishable from participle use, thus providing the gerundio forms in Italian, Spanish, and Portuguese, which are used instead of forms derived from Latin present participles

These functions could be fulfilled by other abstract nouns derived from verbs such as vēnātiō 'hunting'. Gerunds are distinct in two ways.

- Every Latin verb can regularly form a gerund
- A gerund may function syntactically as the head of a verb phrase: for instance, the gerund of a transitive verb may take a direct object in the accusative case, e.g., ad discernendum vocis verbi figuras 'for discerning figures of speech', hominem investigando opera dabo 'I will devote effort to investigating the man'.

However, this was a rare construction. Writers generally preferred the gerundive construction, in which the gerundive adjective was inflected to agree with the noun acting as its object: such as res evertendae reipublicae 'matters concerning the overthrow of the state' (literally 'of the state being overthrown').

When people first wrote grammars of languages such as English, and based them on works of Latin grammar, they adopted the term gerund to label non-finite verb forms with these two properties.

== Gerunds in various languages ==
Meanings of the term gerund as used in relation to various languages are listed below.

=== Latin and Romance ===
Latin has the non-finite gerundium, formed with -andum, -endum and noun inflexions. It is syntactically equivalent to a noun, except in the nominative and accusative cases, which use the infinitive. In particular the ablative case forms (-ando, -endo) were used adverbially. Latin grammars written in English use the form gerund. See the section above for further detail.

Several Romance languages have inherited the form, but without case inflections. They use it primarily in an adverbial function, comparably to the Latin ablative use. The same form may be used in an adjectival function and to express progressive aspect meaning. These languages do not use the term present participle, since it refers to a different form. Grammars of these languages written in English may use the form gerund.

- Italian gerundio: stem form + -ando or -endo
- Spanish gerundio: stem form + -ando or -iendo
- Portuguese gerúndio: stem form + -ando, -endo or -indo
- Romanian gerunziu: stem form + -ând(u) or -ind(u)
- Catalan and French have inherited not the gerund form but the Latin present participle form in -nt.

- Catalan gerundi: stem form + -ant or -ent
- French stem form + -ant. French grammar maintains a distinction between:

- participe présent when the form is used adjectivally, and may be inflected for gender and number.
- gérondif when the form is used adverbially, without inflection, generally after the preposition en. In Modern French, the gérondif cannot be used to express progressive meaning.
Grammars of French written in English may use the forms gerundive and present participle.

=== Germanic ===
In the earliest stages of the West Germanic languages, the infinitive was inflected after a preposition. These dative and, more rarely, genitive case forms are sometimes called gerundium or gerund or West Germanic gerund.

- Old English to berenne (to bear) dative of beran
- Old High German zi beranne dative of beran
- Old Saxon berannia dative of beran
- Old Frisian beranne

- The modern continental successor languages German and Dutch have preserved a few vestiges of these forms, which are sometimes termed gerundium.
- Frisian preserves the original distinction, e.g., West Frisian freegje ("ask") – te freegjen
- English has no vestige of the West Germanic gerund. Traditional grammar uses the term gerund for the -ing form of a verb when it is used as a noun (for example, the verb reading in the sentence "I enjoy reading."). See the sections below for further detail.

- In Dutch, it translates either the term "gerundium" or the description "zelfstandig gebruikte, verbogen onbepaalde wijs van het werkwoord". The infinitive form of the verb is used as gerund, e.g., Zwemmen is gezond.
- Since Afrikaans has by and large lost explicit morphological marking of the infinitive form of the verb, verb stems are used as gerunds, e.g., Swem is gesond.

=== Slavic ===
In descriptions of Slavic languages, the term gerund refers to verbal forms that are also frequently referred to as verbal adverb, adverbial participle, or (in some Slavic languages) deepričástie, a word more closely related to the participle. These forms describe circumstances, actions concurrent (present gerund) or immediately preceding (past gerund) those in the predicate. Morphologically they are uninflected (except in Czech), and syntactically they have an adverbial function, and thus generally bear resemblance to Romance gerunds such as those found in Italian, rather than to noun-like gerunds in English or Latin (except for Latin gerunds in ablative, which describe circumstances and can be translated as verbal adverbs).

- In Bulgarian, it translates the term деепричастие (deepričástie), referring to the verbal adverb formed by adding the suffix -йки (-jki) to the verb form, like ходи (hodi 'they walk') – ходейки (hodejki, 'while walking').
- In Macedonian, it refers to the verbal noun formed by adding the suffix -јќи (-jḱi) to the verb form, like in јаде (jade 'they eat') — јадејќи (jadejḱi, 'while eating').
- In Russian the native verbal adverb is referred to as деепричастие (deepričástie), and as gerund in various non-Russian sources. The gerunds are formed with the suffixes -я (-ja) for the present (imperfective) gerund, and usually with -в (-v) (archaic variant: -вши (-vši)) or -ши (-ši) for the past (perfective) gerund.
- In Serbo-Croatian, it was used to refer to what are now classified as participles and verbal adverbs: present (-ći) and past (-vši, sometimes -v). Modern native Serbo-Croatian grammars rarely use the term.

Additionally, some linguists use the term to refer to deverbal nouns, formed with the reflexes of Proto-Slavic *-ьje suffix, such as Serbo-Croatian glȅdānje 'watching' (from glȅdati 'to watch') or Polish chodzenie 'walking' (from chodzić 'to walk').

=== Other ===
- In Arabic, it refers to the verb's action noun, known as the masdar form (Arabic: المصدر). This form ends in a tanwin and is generally the equivalent of the -ing ending in English.
- In Hebrew, it refers either to the verb's action noun, or to the part of the infinitive following the infinitival prefix (also called the infinitival construct).
- In Hungarian, it has no equivalent category in the classical sense, and is categorized under noun. It may practically refer to the verbal noun, usually formed by appending a suffix. For additional information, see the Hungarian article on its equivalent for infinitives. Common suffixes are -ás (adás, giving), -és (kérés, asking), but verbal nouns are occasionally formed by removing the suffix from the verb (tánc, dance).
- In Irish it is formed by adding ag + the verbal noun. For example, ag scríobh (writing, or “at the act of writing”).
- In Japanese, there are three main grammatical structures with gerund-like functions: first, turning verbs into nouns is achieved, depending on the type of verb and other factors, by using either the conjunctive form (the form that attaches to -masu, -tai, etc.) or the nominalization particles no and koto. Lastly, the continuous and progressive aspect of a verb can be realized by employing the perfective form (-te form) plus the auxiliary verb iru.
- In Korean, it refers to the word '것' ('thing') modified by the adjective form of the verb.
- In Maldivian (Dhivehi), the gerund is the root form of the verb, for example, ނެށުން neshun, meaning "dancing".
- In Persian, it refers to the verb's action noun, known as the ism-masdar form (Persian: اسم مصدر).
- In Turkish, it refers to a large number of verb endings subject to vowel harmony and sometimes used in conjunction with postpositions. Called zarf-fiil, bağ-fiil, ulaç or gerundium and defined as "a verb used as an adverb in a sentence", the Turkish gerund may also constitute part of an (adverbial) clause.

In other languages, it may refer to almost any non-finite verb form; however, it most often refers to an action noun, by analogy with its use as applied to Latin.

== Gerunds in English ==
In traditional grammars of English, the term gerund labels an important use of the form of the verb ending in -ing (for details of its formation and spelling, see English verbs). Other important uses are termed participle (used adjectivally or adverbially), and as a pure verbal noun.

An -ing form is termed gerund when it behaves as a verb within a clause (so that it may be modified by an adverb or have an object); but the resulting clause as a whole (sometimes consisting of only one word, the gerund itself) functions as a noun within the larger sentence.

For example, consider the sentence "Eating this cake is easy." Here, the gerund is the verb eating, which takes an object this cake. The entire clause eating this cake is then used as a noun, which in this case serves as the subject of the larger sentence.

An item such as eating this cake in the foregoing example is an example of a non-finite verb phrase; however, because phrases of this type do not require a subject, it is also a complete clause. (Traditionally, such an item would be referred to as a phrase, but in modern linguistics it has become common to call it a clause.) A gerund clause such as this is one of the types of non-finite clause. The structure may be represented as follows:

Sentence	Subject	Verb	Complement
Eating this cake is easy	Eating this cake	is	easy
Non-finite clause		Verb	Object
Eating this cake		eating	this cake

=== Formation ===
Non-finite verb forms ending in -ing, whether termed gerund or participle, may be marked like finite forms as Continuous or Non-continuous, Perfect or Non-perfect, Active or Passive. Thus, traditional grammars have represented the gerund as having four forms – two for the active voice and two for the passive:

	Active	Passive
Present or Continuous	Loving	Being loved
Perfect	Having loved	Having been loved

The same forms are available when the term participle is used.

=== Examples of use ===
The following sentences illustrate some uses of gerund clauses, showing how such a clause serves as a noun within the larger sentence. In some cases, the clause consists of just the gerund (although in many such cases the word could equally be analyzed as a pure verbal noun).

- Swimming is fun. (gerund as subject of the sentence)
- I like swimming. (gerund as direct object)
- I never gave swimming all that much effort. (gerund as indirect object)
- Swimming in the pool is one way to relax. (gerund phrase as subject)
- Do you fancy swimming in the pool? (gerund phrase as direct object)
- After swimming in the pool, he ate his lunch. (gerund phrase as the complement of a preposition)

Using gerunds of the appropriate auxiliary verbs, one can form gerund clauses that express perfect aspect and passive voice:

- Being deceived can make someone feel angry. (passive)
- Having read the book once before makes me more prepared. (perfect)
- He is ashamed of having been gambling all night. (perfect progressive aspect)

For more detail on when it is appropriate to use a gerund, see Verb patterns classified as gerund use below, and also §§ Uses of English verb forms and Gerund.

=== Distinction from other uses of the -ing form ===
In traditional grammars, gerunds are distinguished from other uses of a verb's -ing form: the present participle (which is a non-finite verb form like the gerund, but is adjectival or adverbial in function), and the pure verbal noun or deverbal noun.

The distinction between gerund and present participles is not recognised in modern reference grammars, since many uses are ambiguous.

=== Roles of "gerund" clauses in a sentence ===
Non finite -ing clauses may have the following roles in a sentence:

	Role	Example
A	Subject	Eating cakes is pleasant.
B	Extraposed subject	It can be pleasant eating cakes.
C	Subject Complement	What I'm looking forward to is eating cakes
D	Direct object	I can't stop eating cakes.
E	Prepositional object	I dreamt of eating cakes.
F	Adverbial	He walks the streets eating cakes.
G	Part of noun phrase	It's a picture of a man eating cakes.
H	Part of adjective phrase	They are all busy eating cakes.
I	Complement of preposition	She takes pleasure in eating cakes.

In traditional grammars, the term gerund is not used for roles F, G, and H.

Thus

1. John suggested asking Bill.
		Subject		Verb		Object		
STRUCTURE OF SENTENCE		John		suggested		asking Bill		Role D object — traditionally asking is a "gerund"
					(no subject)	Verb	Object	
STRUCTURE OF NON-FINITE CLAUSE						asking	Bill	
2. I heard John asking Bill.
		Subject		Verb		Object		
STRUCTURE OF SENTENCE		I		heard		John asking Bill		Role G adverbial — traditionally asking is a "participle"
					Subject	Verb	Object	
STRUCTURE OF NON-FINITE CLAUSE					John	asking	Bill	
3. Playing football is enjoyable
		Subject		Verb		Complement		
STRUCTURE OF SENTENCE		Playing football		is		enjoyable		Role A subject — traditionally playing is a "gerund"
	(no subject)	Verb	Object					
STRUCTURE OF NON-FINITE CLAUSE		playing	football					
4. Her playing of the Bach fugues was inspiring.
		Subject		Verb		Complement		
STRUCTURE OF SENTENCE		Her playing of the Bach fugues		was		inspiring		
	Possessive	Head	Postmodifier					
STRUCTURE OF NOUN PHRASE	Her	playing	of the Bach fugues					Noun phrase, not clause — playing is a verbal noun (also termed deverbal noun)

For more details and examples, see -ing: uses.

=== "Gerund" clauses with a specified subject ===
In traditional grammars, a grammatical subject has been defined in such a way that it occurs only in finite clauses, where it is liable to "agree" with the "number" of the finite verb form. Nevertheless, non-finite clauses imply a "doer" of the verb, even if that doer is indefinite "someone or something". For example,

- We enjoy singing. (ambiguous: somebody sings, possibly ourselves)
- Licking the cream was a special treat (somebody licked the cream)
- Being awarded the prize is a great honour (someone is or may be awarded the prize)

Often the "doer" is clearly signalled

- We enjoyed singing yesterday (we ourselves sang)
- The cat responded by licking the cream (the cat licked the cream)
- His heart is set on being awarded the prize (he hopes he himself will be awarded the prize)
- Meg likes eating apricots (Meg herself eats apricots)

However, the "doer" may not be indefinite or already expressed in the sentence. Rather it must be overtly specified, typically in a position immediately before the non-finite verb

- We enjoyed them singing.
- The cat licking the cream was not generally appreciated.
- We were delighted at Paul being awarded the prize.

The "doer" expression is not the grammatical subject of a finite clause, so objective them is used rather than subjective they.

Traditional grammarians may object to the term subject for these "doers". And prescriptive grammarians go further, objecting to the use of forms more appropriate to the subjects (or objects) of finite clauses. The argument is that this results in two noun expressions with no grammatical connection. They prefer to express the "doer" by a possessive form, such as used with ordinary nouns:

- We enjoyed their singing. (cf. their voices, their attempt to sing)
- The cat's licking the cream was not generally appreciated. (cf. the cat's purr, the cat's escape)
- We were delighted at Paul's being awarded the prize. (cf. Paul's nomination, Paul's acceptance)

Nonetheless, the possessive construction with -ing clauses is very rare in present-day English. Works of fiction show a moderate frequency, but the construction is highly infrequent in other types of text.

Prescriptivists do not object when the non-finite clause modifies a noun phrase

- I saw the cat licking the cream.

The sense of the cat as notional subject of licking is disregarded. Rather they see the cat as exclusively the object of I saw. The modifying phrase licking the cream is therefore described as a participle use.

Henry Fowler claims that the use of a non-possessive noun to precede a gerund arose from confusing the above usage with a participle, and should thus be called fused participle or geriple.

It has been argued that if the prescriptive rule is followed, the difference between the two forms may be used to make a slight distinction in meaning:

- The teacher's shouting startled the student. (shouting is a gerund, the shouting startled the student)
- The teacher shouting startled the student. (shouting can be interpreted as a participle, qualifying the teacher; the teacher startled the student by shouting)
- I don't like Jim's drinking wine. (I don't like the drinking)
- I don't like Jim drinking wine. (I don't like Jim when he is drinking wine)

However, Quirk et al. show that the range of senses of -ing forms with possessive and non-possessive subjects is far more diverse and nuanced:

Sentence	Meaning
The painting of Brown is as skilful as that of Gainsborough.	a. 'Brown's mode of painting' b. 'Brown's action of painting'
Brown's deft painting of his daughter is a delight to watch.	'It is a delight to watch while Brown deftly paints his daughter.'
Brown's deftly painting his daughter is a delight to watch.	a. 'It is a delight to watch Brown's deft action of painting.' b. 'It is a delight to watch while Brown deftly paints.'
I dislike Brown's painting his daughter.	a. "I dislike the fact that Brown paints his daughter.' b. 'I dislike the way Brown paints his daughter.'
I dislike Brown painting his daughter.	'I dislike the fact that Brown paints his daughter (when she ought to be at school).'
I watched Brown painting his daughter.	a. 'I watched Brown as he painted his daughter.' b. 'I watched the process of Brown('s) painting his daughter.'
Brown deftly painting his daughter is a delight to watch.	a. 'It is a delight to watch Brown's deft action of painting his daughter' b. 'It is a delight to watch while Brown deftly paints his daughter.'

These sentences exemplify a spectrum of senses from more noun-like to more verb-like. At the extremes of the spectrum they place

- at the noun end (where possessive Brown's unmistakably expresses ownership) :

Noun phrase	Meaning
some paintings of Brown's	a. 'some paintings that Brown owns' b. 'some paintings painted by Brown'
Brown's paintings of his daughters	a. paintings depicted his daughter and painted by him' b. 'paintings depicting his daughter and painted by somebody else but owned by him'

- and at the verb end (where Brown's would clearly be impossible):

Sentence	Meaning
Painting his daughter, Brown noticed his hand was shaking.	'while he was painting'
Brown painting his daughter that day, I decided to go for a walk.	'since Brown was painting his daughter'
The man painting the girl is Brown.	'who is painting'
The silently painting man is Brown.	'who is silently painting'
Brown is painting his daughter.

In some cases, particularly with a non-personal subject, the use of the possessive before a gerund may be considered redundant even in quite a formal register. For example, "There is no chance of the snow falling" (rather than the prescriptively correct "There is no chance of the snow's falling").

=== Verb patterns classified as "gerund" use ===
The term gerund describes certain uses of -ing clauses as 'complementation' of individual English verbs, that is to say the choice of class that are allowable after that word.

The principal choices of clauses are

Clause type	Example	Subject of clause	Possessive	Passive equivalent
1. finite	I remember that she came.	overt grammatical subject she	impossible	That she came is remembered.— more frequent: It is remembered that she came.
2. bare infinitive	I saw her come.	her acts as object of saw and subject of come	impossible	not possible
3a. to-infinitive without subject	She remembered to come.	notional subject 'understood' as identical to she	n.a.	not possible
3b. to-infinitive with subject	I reminded her to come.	her acts as object of reminded and subject of to come	impossible	She was reminded to come.
4a. -ing without subject	I remember seeing her come.	notional subject 'understood' as identical to I	n.a.	rare but possible: Seeing her come is remembered.
4b. -ing with subject	I remember her coming.	her acts as object of remember and subject of coming	possible	rare but possible: Her coming is remembered.
5a . -ing without subject	She kept coming.	notional subject 'understood' as identical to she	n.a.	not possible
5b. -ing with subject	We kept her coming.	her acts as object of kept and subject of coming	impossible	She was kept coming.
6a. -ing without subject	She ended up coming.	notional subject 'understood' as identical to she	n.a.	not possible
6b. -ing without subject	She wasted time coming.	notional subject 'understood' as identical to she	n.a.	Her time was wasted coming.

- The term gerund is applied to clauses similar to [4a] and [4b].
- In [6a] and [6b] coming is related to the participle use as an adverbial.
- in [5a] and [5b] the verbs kept and coming refer to the same event. Coming is related to the progressive aspect use in She is coming.
- Verbs such as start and stop, although similar to verbs like keep, are generally classified with verbs like remember. Therefore, She started coming is termed a gerund use.
- The proposed test of passivisation to distinguish gerund use after remember from participle use after keep fails with sentences like [5b].
- The proposed test of possible possessive subject successfully distinguishes [4b] (traditional gerund) from [5b] (traditionally participle).

The variant * We kept Jane's coming is not grammatically acceptable.
The variant I remember Jane's coming is acceptable — indeed required by prescriptive grammarians

==== Verbs followed by "gerund" pattern ====
Historically, the -ing suffix was attached to a limited number of verbs to form abstract nouns, which were used as the object of verbs such as like. The use was extended in various ways: the suffix became attachable to all verbs; the nouns acquired verb-like characteristics; the range of verbs allowed to introduce the form spread by analogy first to other verbs expressing emotion, then by analogy to other semantic groups of verbs associated with abstract noun objects; finally the use spread from verbs taking one-word objects to other semantically related groups verbs.

The present-day result of these developments is that the verbs followed by -ing forms tend to fall into semantic classes. The following groups have been derived from analysis of the most common verbs in the COBUILD data bank:

===== Pattern 4a: I remember seeing her come =====
'LIKE' AND 'DISLIKE' GROUP

adore, appreciate, (cannot) bear, (not) begrudge, detest, dislike, (cannot) endure, enjoy, hate, like, loathe, love, (not) mind, mind, prefer, relish, resent, (cannot) stand, (cannot) stomach, (not) tolerate, take to

dread, (not) face, fancy, favour, fear, look forward to

'CONSIDER' GROUP

anticipate, consider, contemplate, debate, envisage, fantasise, imagine, intend, visualise

'REMEMBER' GROUP

forget, miss, recall, recollect, regret, remember, (cannot) remember

'RECOMMEND' GROUP

acknowledge, admit, advise, advocate, debate, deny, describe, forbid, mention, prohibit, propose, recommend, report, suggest, urge

'INVOLVE' GROUP

allow, entail, involve, justify, mean, necessitate, permit, preclude, prevent, save

'POSTPONE' GROUP

defer, delay, postpone, put off

'NEED' GROUP

deserve, need, require, want

'RISK' GROUP

chance, risk

OTHERS WITH -ING OBJECT

discourage, encourage, endure, mime, practise, get away with, go into. go towards, go without, play at

===== Pattern 5a: She kept coming =====
In addition, the COBUILD team identifies four groups of verbs followed by -ing forms that are hard to class as objects. In the verb + -ing object construction the action or state expressed by the verb can be separated from the action or state expressed by the -ing form. In the following groups, the senses are inseparable, jointly expressing a single complex action or state. Some grammarians do not recognise all these patterns as gerund use.

'START' AND 'STOP' GROUP

begin, cease, come, commence, continue, finish, get, go, (not) go, keep, quit, resume, start, stop, burst out, carry on, fall about, fall to, give over, give up, go about, go around/round, go on, keep on, leave off, take to

'AVOID' GROUP

avoid, (not) bother, escape, evade, forbear, omit, (cannot) resist, shun, hold off

'TRY' GROUP

chance, risk, try

'GO RIDING' GROUP

come, go

===== Pattern 4b: I remember her coming =====
Verbs with this pattern do not normally allow the 'subject' of the -ing clause to be used in an equivalent passive construction such as *She is remembered coming.
The COBUILD Guide analyses her coming as the single object of I remember.

Many of the verbs that allow pattern 4a (without object) also allow this pattern.

'LIKE' GROUP (verbs from the above 'LIKE' AND 'DISLIKE', 'DREAD AND LOOK FORWARD TO', 'CONSIDER' and 'REMEMBER' groups)

anticipate, envisage, appreciate, (cannot) bear, (not) begrudge, contemplate, dislike, dread, envisage, fear, forget, hate, (will not) have, imagine, like, (not) mind, picture, recall, recollect, remember, (not) remember, resent, see, stand, tolerate, visualise, want, put up with

'REPORT' GROUP (subset of the above 'RECOMMEND' GROUP)

describe, mention, report

'ENTAIL' GROUP (subset of the above 'INVOLVE' GROUP)

entail, involve, justify, mean, necessitate

'STOP' GROUP (subset of the above 'START' AND 'STOP' GROUP)

avoid, preclude, prevent, prohibit, resist, save, stop

'RISK' GROUP (identical with above)

chance, risk

===== Pattern 5b: We kept her coming =====
In contrast to Pattern 4b, these verbs allow the 'subject' of the -ing clauses to be used in an equivalent passive construction such as She was kept coming.
The COBUILD guide analyses her coming as a string of two objects of We kept:– (1)her and (2)coming.

'SEE' GROUP

catch, feel, find, hear, notice, observe, photograph (usually passive), picture (usually passive), see, show, watch

'BRING' GROUP

bring, have, keep, leave, send, set

===== Pattern 6a: She ended up coming =====
These verbs refer to starting, spending or ending time.
The following -ing form is an adverbial, traditionally classed as a participle rather than a gerund.

die, end up, finish up, hang around, start off, wind up

===== Pattern 6b: She wasted time coming =====
These verbs also relate to time (and, by extension, money). The object generally expresses this concept.
However, the object of busy or occupy must be a reflexive pronoun, e.g., She busied herself coming.
The following -ing form is an adverbial, generally classed as a participle rather than a gerund.

begin, busy, end, finish, kill, occupy, pass, spend, start, take, waste

==== Verbs followed by either "gerund" or to-infinitive pattern ====
Like the -ing suffix, the to-infinitive spread historically from a narrow original use, a prepositional phrase referring to future time. Like the -ing form it spread to all English verbs and to form non-finite clauses. Like the -ing form, it spread by analogy to use with words of similar meaning.

A number of verbs now belong in more than one class in their choice of 'complementation'.

===== Patterns 4a and 3a: I remember seeing her come and She remembered to come =====
Verbs in both 'START' AND 'STOP' (-ing) GROUP and 'BEGIN' (to-infinitive) GROUPS

begin, cease, come, commence, continue, get, start,
Also go on — with different meanings

She went on singing — 'She continued singing'
She went on to sing — 'Afterwards, she sang'
She went on at me to sing — 'She nagged me to sing' (i.e. that I should sing)

Superficially, stop appears to be used in the 3a (to-infinitive) pattern

She stopped to sing — 'She stopped in order to sing'

However, the phrase to sing is quite separate and separable

She stopped for a moment to sing
She stopped what she was doing to sing

And the phrase may be used in all manner of sentences

She travelled to Paris to sing
She abandoned her husband and her children to sing

Verbs in both 'DREAD' AND LOOK FORWARD TO' (-ing) GROUP and 'HOPE' (to-infinitive) GROUPS

dread, fear

Verb in both 'CONSIDER' (-ing) GROUP and 'HOPE' (to-infinitive) GROUPS

intend

Verb in both 'REMEMBER' (-ing) GROUP and 'MANAGE' (to-infinitive) GROUPS

remember — with different meanings

I remembered going —'I remembered that I had previously gone'
I remembered to go —'I remembered that I had to go, so I did go'

Verbs in both 'NEED' (-ing) GROUP and 'NEED' (to-infinitive) GROUPS

deserve, need

===== Patterns 4a, 4b, 3a and 3b: I remember coming, She remembered to come, I remember her coming and I reminded her to come =====
Verbs in both 'LIKE AND DISLIKE' (-ing) and WITH OBJECT (to-infinitive) GROUPS

hate, like, love, prefer
Unlike other Pattern 3b verbs, the object is indivisible

He hates his wife to stand out in a crowd does not mean He hates his wife

With would there is often a difference of meaning

I like living in Ambridge — 'I live in Ambridge, and I like it'
I would like to live in Ambridge — 'I don't live in Ambridge, but I have a desire to live there in the future'
I would like living in Ambridge — 'I don't live in Ambridge, but if I ever did live there, I would enjoy it'

There is an apparent similarity between

I like boxing — 'I box and I enjoy it'
I like boxing — 'I watch other people boxing and I enjoy it'

However, only the former meaning is possible with an extended non-finite clause

I like boxing with an experienced opponent — 'I like it when I box with an experienced opponent'

===== Patterns 4a and 3b: I remember coming and I reminded her to come =====
Verbs in both 'RECOMMEND' (-ing) and 'TELL' or 'NAG' AND 'COAX'(to-infinitive) GROUPS

advise, forbid, recommend, urge
These verbs do not admit -ing Pattern 4b with a word serving as object of the RECOMMEND verb. However they can be used with a possessive 'subject' of the -ing form.

I advised leaving — 'I advised somebody (unidentified) that we (or the person or people we have in mind) should leave'
I advised him to leave — 'I advised him that he should leave' but not *I advised him leaving
I advised his leaving — 'I advised somebody (unidentified) that he should leave

Verbs in both 'CONSIDER' (-ing) and 'BELIEVE' or 'EXPECT' (to-infinitive) GROUPS

consider, intend

===== Patterns 4b and 3b: I remember her coming and I reminded her to come =====
Verbs in both the 'SEE ' (-ing) and 'OBSERVE' (to-infinitive) GROUPS

hear, see, observe
The to-infinitive pattern occurs in passive clauses, e.g., She was seen to come.
Corresponding active clauses use the bare infinitive pattern, e.g., We saw her come.

Verbs in both the 'SEE ' (-ing) and 'BELIEVE' (to-infinitive) GROUPS

feel, find, show (usually passive)

Verb in both the 'ENTAIL' subgroup (-ing) and the 'EXPECT' (to-infinitive) GROUPS

mean — with different meanings

That means her going tomorrow — 'In that case she'll go tomorrow'
We mean her to go tomorrow — 'We intend that she'll go tomorrow'
She's meant to be here tomorrow — 'It is intended that she'll be here tomorrow'
She's meant to be here now — 'It was intended that she should be here now, but she isn't'

===== Patterns 5a and 3a: She kept coming and She remembered to come =====
Verb in both the 'TRY' (-ing) and 'TRY' (to-infinitive) GROUPS

try — with different meanings

She tried leaving — 'She left in order to see what might happen (or how she might feel)'
She tried to leave — 'She attempted to leave'

==== Verbs followed by either "gerund" or bare infinitive pattern ====
===== Patterns 4b and 2: I remember her coming and I saw her come =====
Verb in both the 'SEE ' (-ing) and 'SEE' (bare infinitive) GROUPS

feel. hear, notice, see, watch
These patterns are sometimes used to express different meanings

I saw him leaving — 'I saw him as he was leaving'
I saw him leave — 'I saw him as he left'

=== Borrowings of English -ing forms in other languages ===
English verb forms ending in -ing are sometimes borrowed into other languages. In some cases, they become pseudo-anglicisms, taking on new meanings or uses not found in English. For instance, camping means "campsite" in many languages, while parking often means a car park. Both these words are treated as nouns, with none of the features of the gerund in English. For more details and examples, see -ing words in other languages.

== See also ==
- Gerundive
- Infinitive
- Non-finite verb
- Participle
- Verbal noun
