= Final-over-final constraint =

Proposed constraint in theoretical linguistics

In linguistics, the final-over-final constraint (or final-over-final condition; FOFC) is a proposed constraint in word-order variation in natural language concerning the hierarchical structure seen in extended projections, which asserts that a head-final phrase cannot immediately dominate a head-initial phrase if they are in the same extended projection. The FOFC has been suggested as a potential linguistic universal, following the Chomskyan research program in which the existence of linguistic universals is assumed to arise from an innate biological component of the language faculty that allows humans to learn language. Specifically, it is defined as:

If $\alpha$ and $\beta$ are members of the same extended projection, then a head-final $\beta P$ cannot immediately dominate a head-initial $\alpha P$, as below:

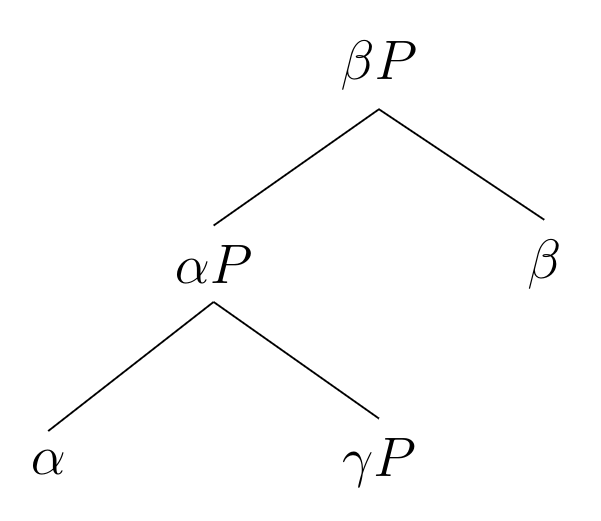
Head final $\beta P$ immediately dominates head-initial $\alpha P$, violating the Final-over-Final constraint.

This effect was first noticed by Anders Holmberg in Finnish, when comparing it to the similarly disharmonic head-initial over head-final structure:

Kyllä se [_{AuxP} on_{Aux} [_{VP} ostanut_{V} auton]]
indeed he {} has {} bought car
'He has indeed bought a car'

Kyllä se [_{AuxP} [_{VP} auton ostanut_{V}] on_{Aux}]
indeed he {} {} car bought has

Kyllä se [_{AuxP} on_{Aux} [_{VP} auton] on_{Aux}]
indeed he {} has {} car bought

*Kyllä se [_{AuxP} [_{VP} ostanut_{V} auton] on_{Aux}]
indeed he {} {} bought car has
(Holmberg, 2000)

== Accounting for the FOFC with the Linear Correspondence Axiom (LCA) ==
Biberauer, Holmberg and Roberts (2014) propose an account of the FOFC derived from Kayne's Antisymmetry Theory and the Linear Correspondence Axiom (LCA), in which all maximal projections follow the 'specifier head-complement template' as below, and all variation in word-order arises due to movement.

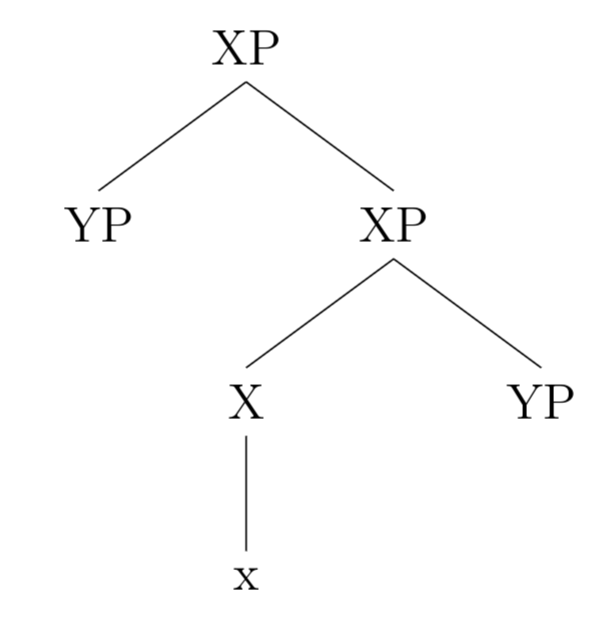

Biberaer et al. assume that all movement is triggered by the presence of a movement diacritic $\wedge$ with no semantic content such that movement to the specifier of a head $\alpha$ is triggered by the presence of $\wedge$ on $\alpha$. Functional heads cannot introduce $\wedge$, though they may inherit it from the head of their complement. Then from this, the proposal is that the following more formally defined constraint holds.

Final-over-Final Constraint: If a head $\alpha_i$ in the extended projection EP of a lexical head L, EP(L), has $\wedge$ associated with its $[\plusmn V]$-feature, then so does $\alpha_{i + 1}$, where $\alpha_{i+1}$ is c-selected by $\alpha_i$ in EP(L).

== Other accounts of the FOFC ==
There have been attempts, notably by Carlo Cecchetto and Hedde Zeijlstra, to account for the FOFC asymmetry without making use of the LCA, instead basing their accounts as coming from restrictions in parsing on rightward-dependencies.

Cecchetto proposes that if backward dependencies cannot cross phrase structure boundaries, then the Right-roof constraint (a locality condition on rightward movement) and FOFC are 'two faces of the same coin', as they both constrain the generation of structures that involve backward localisation; a trace, in the case of the Right-roof constraint, or in regards to the selected head of a selecting head in the case of FOFC, and so the FOFC-violating configuration will only be possible if $\beta$ is a movement target for $\alpha P$ rather than $\alpha$ as backward localisation is costly for the parser and will only be possible if it is very local.

Zeijlstra's account, meanwhile, derives largely from Abels & Neeleman's account of Greenberg's Universal 20, which observes that head movement within an extended projection cannot be rightward unless the movement is string-vacuous, which not only circumvents the theoretical and empirical challenges to LCA, but also accounts for particles which often form counter-examples to FOFC.

== Counterexamples and Challenges to the FOFC ==
It seems to be the case that clause-final particles in VO languages form a natural class of counterexamples to the FOFC. Thus, it must be then investigated whether such counterexamples do indeed violate FOFC, and if so, then any account of FOFC must be revised to account for such counterexamples. For example, sentence-final Tense-Aspect-Mood particles appear in many East Asian and Central African languages (Examples from Mumuye; Shimizu 1983: 107 & 112)

Znàso̘ baasé ranti yé
Znaso mimic Ranti PERF
'Znaso has mimicked Ranti'

Znàso̘ dé baasé ranti ni.
Znaso PERF mimic Ranti IMMED.FUT
'Znaso is about to mimic Ranti.'

Notably, none of these particles exhibit inflectional morphology and as such do not exhibit any φ-agreement, and so it seems that a theory that concerns FOFC should account for the fact that particles that exhibit inflection seem to be pervasively FOFC-compliant, however non-inflected particles often are not.

== See also ==
- Antisymmetry
- Syntactic movement
- Logical form (linguistics)
- Phonetic form
- Greenberg's linguistic universals
