= Dynamic antisymmetry =

Theory of syntactic movement

Dynamic antisymmetry is a theory of syntactic movement presented in Andrea Moro's 2000 monograph Dynamic Antisymmetry based on the work presented in Richard S. Kayne's 1994 monograph The Antisymmetry of Syntax.

A premise: the antisymmetry of syntaxThe crux of Kayne's theory is that hierarchical structure in natural language maps universally onto a particular surface linearization, namely specifier-head-complement branching order. To understand what is meant by hierarchical structure, consider the sentence, The King of England likes apples. We can replace this by, He likes apples. Since the phrase the King of England can be replaced by a pronoun, we say that it constitutes a hierarchical unit (called a constituent). Further constituency tests reveal the phrase likes apples to be a constituent. Hierarchical units are built up according to the principles of phrase structure into a branching tree formation rather than into a linear order. Older theories of linearization posited various algorithms for translating the hierarchical structure into a linear order; however, Antisymmetry holds that linear order falls out from the hierarchical relationships among the constituents. In this particular case, there is a relation of asymmetric c-command between the constituent the King of England and likes apples. Therefore, the first constituent is ordered linearly before the second. Further tests ultimately give rise to linear order for the internal parts of these constituents. The theory of the antisymmetry of syntax has a twofold aims. On the one hand, it derives a version of X-bar theory, a formal theory of phrase structure in transformational generative grammar, by means of a unique principle: the Linear Correspondence Axiom (LCA). According to this principle - simplifying - a word W precedes a word W' if and only if W is contained in a node Q that asymmetrically c-commands a node R containing W'. It follows that there cannot be two nodes that mutually c-command each other, unless either one of them contains another node, otherwise the words which are contained in the two nodes could not be linearized. On the other hand, it captures the fact that many structures and derivations that are found in certain languages do not have mirror counterparts in other languages by the same principle. Kayne hypothesized that all phrases whose surface order is not specifier-head-complement have undergone movements which disrupt this underlying order. Subsequently, there have also been attempts at deriving specifier-complement-head as the basic word order.

Dynamic antisymmetry and linearization is a weak version of the theory of antisymmetry developed by Andrea Moro and allows the generation of non-LCA compatible structures (points of symmetry) before the hierarchical structure is linearized at Phonetic Form. The LCA is only active when required: in other words, universal grammar is more parsimonious than in the other model, in that it does not impose restrictions when they are not detectable, i.e. linearization before the articulatory-perceptual interface. In fact, Dynamic Antisymmetry considers movement as a way to rescue structures from a crash at the articulatory-perceptual interface. The unwanted structures are rescued by movement: deleting the phonetic content of the moved element would neutralize the linearization problem. From this perspective, Dynamic Antisymmetry aims at unifying movement and phrase structure which would otherwise be two independent properties that characterize all human language grammars.

Dynamic antisymmetry and labelling: the principle of Dynamic antisymmetry has also been interpreted in computational terms. More specifically: when two XPs are Merged and neither one follows the projection principle, then the structure cannot be computed unless either one moves, thereby forcing the other to project. That's because a single copy is only one link of a bigger chain. This proposal has been formulated as a paper now collected in Moro 2013; see Chomsky 2013 for the proposal to generalise this principle and include it in the standard theory.

== See also ==
- Antisymmetry
