= Command =

Command may refer to:

== Computing ==
- Command (computing), a statement in a computer language
- command (Unix), a Unix command
- COMMAND.COM, the default operating system shell and command-line interpreter for DOS
- Command key, a modifier key on Apple Macintosh computer keyboards
- Command pattern, a software design pattern in which objects represent actions
- Voice command, in speech recognition

== Military ==
- Military command (instruction) or military order
- Command responsibility, the doctrine of hierarchical accountability in cases of war crimes
- Command (military formation), an organizational unit
- Command and control, the exercise of authority in a military organization
- Command hierarchy, a group of people dedicated to carrying out orders "from the top"

== Music ==
- Command (album), a 2009 album by Client
- Command Records, a record label

== Sports ==
- Command (baseball), the ability of a pitcher to throw a pitch where he intends to
- Kansas City Command, a former professional arena football team
- Commands (horse), Australian thoroughbred racehorse

== Other uses ==
- Command, a verb using the imperative mood or the whole sentence containing such a verb
- Command (teaching style)
- Command: Modern Air Naval Operations, strategy game

== See also ==
- Command paper, a policy paper or report issued by, for or to the British government
- Command economy, a form of planned economy
- C-command, in theoretical linguistics
  - M-command, a broader version of c-command in theoretical linguistics
- The Command (disambiguation)
