= Peer-Partner (teaching style) =

Peer-Partner is one of the choices available to students in Student-Directed Teaching, a progressive teaching technology.

Along with Student-Teacher Contract and Self-Directed, Peer-Partner is a teaching style that requires a different level of independence from Command and Task. It is, to some extent, a self-directed teaching style that allows the student to learn in his or her own fashion.

Under Peer-Partner, the teacher will:

- Provide a unit plan consisting of the objectives for several days, written in a language that the students can understand
- Visit with each student at least once each period: this provides an opportunity to assess the progress of the peer-partners
- Determine the appropriateness of the style selected by each student
- Use good questioning techniques and negotiation to help steer the students to becoming more independent
- Provide perception checks and final tests as indicated in the unit plan
- Provide a second evaluative activity if required by an individual student

The student will:

- Choose a partner very carefully, considering each other's learning characteristics when making the choice
- Study each objective and jointly decide how the learning will take place. Discussion is an important component of this style
- Listen to the instruction the teacher is providing for the Command and Task students, if the objective is beyond the experience of both students
- Consider what they know and what they don't know when selecting the amount and type of practice
- Check each other's work
- Declare the mark expected on each perception check
- Do more than one perception check if the declared mark is not within the flexibility factor
- Prepare a plan which will indicate how they are going to use their Earned Time.
