= Government and binding theory =

Theory of syntax

Government and binding (GB, GBT) is a theory of syntax and a phrase structure grammar in the tradition of transformational grammar developed principally by Noam Chomsky in the 1980s. This theory is a radical revision of his earlier theories and was later revised in The Minimalist Program (1995) and several subsequent papers, the latest being Three Factors in Language Design (2005). Although there is a large literature on government and binding theory which is not written by Chomsky, Chomsky's papers have been foundational in setting the research agenda.

The name refers to two central subtheories of the theory: government, which is an abstract syntactic relation applicable, among other things, to the assignment of case; and binding, which deals chiefly with the relationships between pronouns and the expressions with which they are co-referential. GB was the first theory to be based on the principles and parameters model of language, which also underlies the later developments of the minimalist program.

== Government ==
The main application of the government relation concerns the assignment of case. Government is defined as follows:

A governs B if and only if

- A is a governor and
- A m-commands B and
- no barrier intervenes between A and B.

Governors are heads of the lexical categories (V, N, A, P) and tensed I (T). A m-commands B if A does not dominate B and B does not dominate A and the first maximal projection of A dominates B, where the maximal projection of a head X is XP. This means that for example in a structure like the following, A m-commands B, but B does not m-command A:

In addition, barrier is defined as follows: A barrier is any node Z such that

- Z is a potential governor for B and
- Z c-commands B and
- Z does not c-command A

The government relation makes case assignment unambiguous. The tree diagram below illustrates how DPs are governed and assigned case by their governing heads:

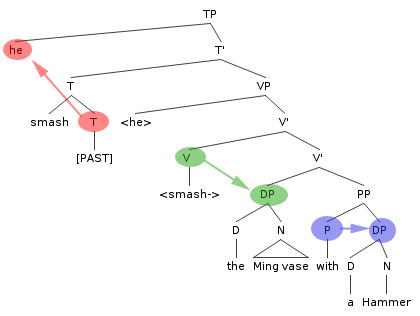

Another important application of the government relation constrains the occurrence and identity of traces as the Empty Category Principle requires them to be properly governed.

== Binding ==
Binding can be defined as follows:

- An element α binds an element β if and only if α c-commands β, and α and β corefer.

Consider the sentence "John_{i} saw his_{i} mother", which is diagrammed below using simple phrase structure trees.

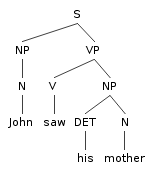

The NP "John" c-commands "his" because the first parent of the NP, S, contains "his". "John" and "his" are also coreferential (they refer to the same person), therefore "John" binds "his".

On the other hand, in the ungrammatical sentence "*The mother of John_{i} likes himself_{i}", "John" does not c-command "himself", so they have no binding relationship despite the fact that they corefer.

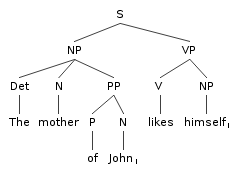

The importance of binding is shown in the grammaticality or ungrammaticality of the following sentences:

1. *John_{i} saw him_{i}.
2. John_{i} saw himself_{i}.
3. *Himself_{i} saw John_{i}.
4. *John_{i} saw John_{i}.

Binding is used, along with particular binding principles, to explain the ungrammaticality of statements 1, 3, and 4. The applicable rules are called Binding Principle A, Binding Principle B, and Binding Principle C.

- Principle A: an anaphor (reflexive or reciprocal, such as "each other") must be bound in its governing category (roughly, the clause).

Since "himself" is not c-commanded by "John" in sentence [3], Principle A is violated.

- Principle B: a pronoun must be free (i.e., not bound) within its governing category (roughly, the clause).

In sentence [1], "him" is bound by "John", violating Principle B.

- Principle C: an R-expression must be free (i.e., not bound). R-expressions (e.g. "the dog" or "John") are referential expressions: unlike pronouns and anaphora, they independently refer, i.e., pick out entities in the world.

In sentence [4], the first instance of "John" binds the second, violating Principle C.

Note that Principles A and B refer to "governing categories"—domains which limit the scope of binding. The definition of a governing category laid out in Lectures on Government and Binding is complex, but in most cases the governing category is essentially the minimal clause or complex NP.

== Sources ==
- Liliane Haegeman (1994). Introduction to Government and Binding Theory (Second Edition). Blackwell.
