= Empty category principle =

In linguistics, the empty category principle (ECP) was proposed in Noam Chomsky's syntactic framework of government and binding theory. The ECP is supposed to be a universal syntactic constraint that requires certain types of empty categories, namely traces, to be properly governed.

ECP is a principle of transformational grammar by which traces must be visible, i.e. they must be identifiable as empty positions in the surface structure, similar to the principle of reconstruction for deletion. Thus an empty category is in a position subcategorized for by a verb. In government and binding theory this is known as proper government. Proper government occurs either if the empty position is governed by a lexical category (especially if it is not a subject) (theta-government) or if it is coindexed with a maximal projection which governs it (antecedent-government). The ECP has been revised many times and is a central part of government and binding theory.

In spite of its name, the ECP applies to only two of the four types of null DPs. Specifically, it applies to DP- and Wh-traces, but not PRO and pro. The chief function of the ECP is to place constraints on the movement of categories by the rule of move α; it effectively allows a tree structure to "remember" what has happened at earlier stages of a derivation, and it can be seen as GB's version of the older derivational constraints.

Formally, the ECP states that:

- Traces must be properly governed:
  - A properly governs B iff A theta-governs B or A antecedent-governs B
    - A theta-governs B iff A governs B and A theta-marks B
    - A antecedent-governs B iff A governs B and A is coindexed with B.

The ECP is a way of accounting for, among other things, the empirical fact that it is generally more difficult to move up a wh-word from a subject position than from an object position.

The intermediate traces must be deleted because they cannot be properly governed; theta-government is impossible because of the position they occupy, Spec-CP; the only possible antecedent-governor might be an overt NP (a wh-word), but the Minimality Condition would always be violated because of the tensed I (which must be present in all matrix clauses), the tensed I would c-command the intermediate trace but it would not c-command the wh-word. So we have to say that intermediate traces must be deleted at logical form so that they can avoid the ECP.

In the case of object extraction (the trace is a complement of VP), theta-government is the only possible option. In the case of subject extraction (the trace in Spec-IP), antecedent-government is the only possible option.

If the trace is in Spec-IP and we have an overt complementizer (such as that), the sentence is ungrammatical because the ECP is violated. The closest potential governor would be the complementizer, which cannot antecedent-govern the trace because it is not coindexed with it (and theta-government is impossible since trace is in Spec-IP).

For example, in the sentence Who do you think (that) John will invite? the ECP works in the following way (the structure is given for the embedded clause only):

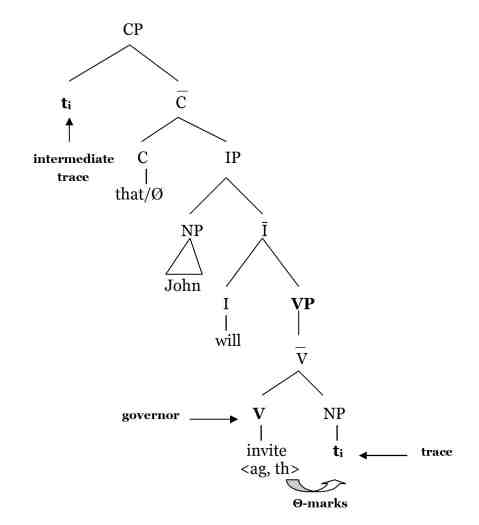

== See also ==
- Wh-movement
