= International Network in Biolinguistics =

The International Network in Biolinguistics is an international network to do research on the biological basis of the language faculty, linking theoretical linguistics, developmental psychology, theoretical biology, evolutionary biology and psychology, molecular biology, genetics, and physics. It has members from varieties of discipline across the globe.

== Members ==
Michael A. Arbib, Evan Balaban, Robert Berwick, Thomas G. Bever, Cedric Boeckx, Johan J. Bolhuis, Lisa Cheng, Noam Chomsky, Anna Maria Di Sciullo, Ansgar Endress, Simon E. Fisher, W. Tecumseh Fitch, Angela D. Friederici, Roland Friedrich, Koji Fujita, Alessandra Giorgi, Kleanthes K. Grohmann, Mohamed Guerssel, Heidi Harley, Marc Hauser, Lyle Jenkins, Richard S. Kayne, Peter Kosta, Marie Labelle, Richard Larson, Howard Lasnik, Giuseppe Longobardi, John S. Lumsden, Jing Luo, James McGilvray, Ningombam Bupenda Meitei, Partha Mitra, Andrea Moro, Massimo Piattelli-Palmarini, David Poeppel, Luigi Rizzi, Kenneth Safir, Uli Sauerland, Fuzhen Si, Karin Stromswold, Juan Uriagereka, Elly Van Gelderen, Andrew Wedel, Kenneth Wexler, Charles Yang.

== Conferences ==
=== 2013 ===
Sur la complexité des langues humaines, UQAM, February 8, 2013

- This miniworkshop on language complexity is in French.

=== 2011 ===
New Perspectives on Language Creativity: Composition and Recursion, UQAM, September 25–27, 2011

=== 2010 ===
The Language Design, UQAM, May 27–30, 2010

=== 2008 ===
First Meeting of the INB, Tucson, Arizona, February 23–24, 2008.

=== 2007 ===
Biolinguistic Investigations, Santo Domingo, 2007

Biolinguistics: Language Evolution and Variation, Venice, 2007.

== Papers ==
The list of papers is the production from different contributors and subject experts of the world.
