= Kleanthes K. Grohmann =

German linguist, academic, and author

- Born: June 5, 1972 (age 54); Herford, Germany
- Occupations: Linguist, academic and author

Academic background
- Education: BA., Linguistics, University of Wales, Bangor; PhD., Linguistics, University of Maryland, College Park
- Doctoral advisor: Norbert Hornstein
- Other advisor: Ian Roberts
- Website: http://www.kleanthes.biolinguistics.eu/

Kleanthes K. Grohmann is a German linguist, academic, and author. He is a professor of Biolinguistics in the Department of English Studies at the University of Cyprus and the founding Director of the Cyprus Acquisition Team (CAT Lab).

Grohmann's research focuses on biolinguistics, with emphasis on syntactic theory, language acquisition and development, language pathologies, and multilingualism. He has authored, co-authored, and edited research articles and books including Prolific Domains: On the Anti-locality of Movement Dependencies, InterPhases: Phase-Theoretic Investigations of Linguistic Interfaces, The Cambridge Handbook of Biolinguistics, and the textbook Understanding Minimalism. He is also the founding co-editor of the book series Language Faculty and Beyond.

Grohmann is a member of the International Network in Biolinguistics, and has held various editorial positions. He is the founding Editor-in-Chief of Biolinguistics, and Associate Editor for the special section on Autism in Frontiers in Psychiatry.

== Education ==
Grohmann obtained a bachelor's degree in Linguistics from the University of Wales, Bangor (UK) in 1996 under the supervision of Ian Roberts and a PhD in linguistics from the University of Maryland, College Park (USA) in 2000, where his doctoral advisor was Norbert Hornstein.

== Career ==
Grohmann began his academic career as a Research Fellow at the Center for General Linguistics, Typology and Universals (ZAS Berlin) and as a Postdoc at the Goethe University Frankfurt from 2001 to 2002. Subsequently, he joined the University of Cyprus as a Visiting Lecturer, becoming Visiting Assistant Professor and later assistant professor of Theoretical Linguistics in 2004. He was promoted to associate professor of Biolinguistics in 2009. Since 2015, he has been serving as Professor of Biolinguistics in the Department of English Studies at the University of Cyprus.

Outside the University of Cyprus, Grohmann became a Research Associate in the Center for Research on Bilingualism at Bangor University (2011–2014) and has been an International Advisory Board Member of the University of Illinois Bilingualism Research Laboratory since 2011.

In 2010, he co-founded the Linguistic Society of America (LSA) Special Interest Group for Biolinguistics and has been serving as the Director of the Cyprus Acquisition Team (CAT Lab) since its foundation in 2008.

== Research ==
Grohmann has contributed to the field of linguistics by studying the syntax, semantics, and pragmatics of Wh-question formation, pronominal grammar, morpho-syntax, movement diagnostics, clause structure, non-finiteness, computation, predication, and related topics. He is most known for his proposal that movement dependencies have to span a minimum (structural) distance, known as anti-locality. His theoretical approach to the scientific study of language is rooted in the Chomskyan tradition of generative grammar, the so-called Minimalist Program.

== Works ==
Grohmann has authored, co-authored and co-edited works focusing on biolinguistics, psycholinguistics and socio-syntax. His 2003 book Prolific Domains: On the Anti-locality of Movement Dependencies explored anti-locality, an approach to syntactic computation and clause structure, introducing domains to restrict movement and offering a unified account of standard and anti-locality across clauses. In her review for the Language, Asya Pereltsvaig commented: "The book is clearly written and well argued. In addition to its contribution as a research monograph, it can be used as a text for an advanced undergraduate or graduate syntax course."

In 2013, Grohmann co-edited The Cambridge Handbook of Biolinguistics with Cedric Boeckx, exploring language development, evolution, and neuroscience, covering topics such as the language instinct, critical period hypothesis, and bilingualism. He also published a textbook, Understanding Minimalism alongside Norbert Hornstein and Jairo Nunesa, which introduces minimalist grammar, contrasting it with Government and Binding analyses. Mary Aizawa Kato remarked, "The book is highly recommended for all students of natural language syntax and generativists in particular."

=== Biolinguistics ===
Grohmann researched biolinguistics throughout his career. He outlined foundational questions in biolinguistics, distinguishing it from generative grammar, and proposed a research agenda on language pathology in comparative biolinguistics. With Maria Kambanaros, Evelina Leivada, Natalia Pavlou, Charley Rowe, and other students, postdocs, and colleagues from the CAT Lab, he explored language development in Cypriot Greek, introducing "bi-x" with emphasis on "(discrete) bilectalism" and the Socio-Syntax of Development Hypothesis to understand the connection between biolinguistic implications and clitic placement acquisition.

=== Psycholinguistics ===
Grohmann's work on psycholinguistics encompassed language development and performance, particularly in children. In a 2014 study with Marina Varnava, he investigated how Cypriot Greek-speaking children aged 4 to 9 acquire the interpretation of wh-questions, revealing developmental discrepancies in a diglossic environment.

In joint work with Maria Kambanaros, Grohmann also looked into how children with specific language impairment (SLI) use general all-purpose (GAP) verbs as a sign of immature language, emphasizing the distinction from light verbs in language development. Additionally, they examined the language performance of a child with 22q11 deletion syndrome at ages 6 and 10, revealing improved morphosyntactic abilities over time but no changes in nonverbal IQ or vocabulary.

Collaborating with Christiana Christodoulou, Grohmann analyzed subjunctive clause comprehension in Greek Cypriot bilectal children with Down syndrome, finding parallel performance with typically developing children and unaffected acquisition by linguistic differences.

=== Multilingualism ===
Grohmann has investigated multilingualism and its impact on language acquisition. In joint research, he observed multilingual children with specific language impairment showing a consistent preference for retrieving nouns over verbs, suggesting a shared grammatical principle across languages. He also used cognates as an effective intervention for multilingual children with specific language impairment, resulting in significant improvement in English and cross-linguistic transfer effects to Bulgarian and Greek.

Grohmann and colleagues found executive control advantages in bilectal children (Cypriot Greek and Standard Modern Greek) over monolinguals, linked to working memory and inhibition, emerging after considering lower language proficiency.

== Bibliography ==
=== Selected books ===
- Prolific Domains: On the Anti-locality of Movement Dependencies (2003), John Benjamins; ISBN 978-1-58811-441-9
- Understanding Minimalism (2005, with Norbert Hornstein & Jairo Nunes), Cambridge University Press; ISBN 978-0-521-53194-8
- InterPhases: Phase-Theoretic Investigations of Linguistic Interfaces (2009, ed.), Oxford University Press; ISBN 978-019954113
- The Cambridge Handbook of Biolinguistics (2013, ed. with Cedric Boeckx), Cambridge University Press; ISBN 978-0-521-76153-6
- Multifaceted Multilingualism (2024, ed.), John Benjamins; ISBN 978-90-272-1463-8

=== Selected articles ===
- Castillo, J. C., Drury, J. E., & Grohmann, K. K. (1999). Merge over move and the extended projection principle.
- Grohmann, K. K., Drury, J., & Castillo, J. C. (2000). No more EPP. In Proceedings of WCCFL (Vol. 19, pp. 139–152).
- Boeckx, C., & Grohmann, K. K. (2007). Remark: Putting phases in perspective. Syntax, 10(2), 204–222.
- Boeckx, C., & Grohmann, K. K. (2007). The biolinguistics manifesto. Biolinguistics, 1, 001–008.
- Antoniou, K., Grohmann, K. K., Kambanaros, M., & Katsos, N. (2016). The effect of childhood bilectalism and multilingualism on executive control. Cognition, 149, 18–30.
- Fyndanis, V., Miceli, G., Capasso, R., Killmer, H., Malefaki, S., & Grohmann, K. K. (2023). Production of Sentential Negation in German and Italian Non-fluent Aphasia. Journal of Psycholinguistic Research, 52(2), 497–524.
