= C command =

C command may refer to:

- C syntax, keywords in the C programming language
- C standard library, a set of subroutines available to programs in the C programming language
- c-command, the "uncle" relationship in a parse tree
