= Antisymmetry =

Syntactic theory in linguistics

In linguistics, antisymmetry, is a theory of syntax described in Richard S. Kayne's 1994 book The Antisymmetry of Syntax. Building upon X-bar theory, it proposes a universal, fundamental word order for phrases (branching) across languages: specifier-head-complement. This means a phrase typically starts with an introductory element (specifier), followed by the core (head, often a verb or noun), and then additional information (complement). The theory argues that any sentence structure that deviates from this order results from rearrangements (syntactic movements) of this underlying structure. For instance, a sentence like "Eat the cake quickly" might be analyzed as a rearrangement of a more basic specifier-head-complement structure "Quickly eat the cake".

While Kayne proposes specifier-head-complement as the base order, some linguists have suggested alternative base orders, such as specifier-complement-head. Antisymmetry is reliant on x-bar notions, which are disputed by constituency structure theories (as opposed to dependency structure theories).

This framework is important for syntacticians as it offers a restrictive theory of possible sentence structures, potentially explaining cross-linguistic variations in word order and constraining the range of grammatical analyses.

== Asymmetric c-command ==
C-command is a relation between tree nodes, as defined by Tanya Reinhart. Kayne uses a simple definition of c-command based on the "first node up". However, the definition is complicated by his use of a "segment/category" distinction. Two directly connected nodes that have the same label are "segments" of a single "category". A category "excludes" all categories not "dominated" by all its segments. A "c-commands" B if every category that dominates A also dominates B, and A excludes B. The following tree illustrates these concepts:

AP_{1} and AP_{2} are both segments of a single category. AP does not c-command BP because it does not exclude BP. CP does not c-command BP because both segments of AP do not dominate BP (so it is not the case that every category that dominates CP dominates BP). BP c-commands CP and A. A c-commands C. The definitions above may perhaps be thought to allow BP to c-command AP, but a c-command relation is not usually assumed to hold between two such categories, and for the purposes of antisymmetry, the question of whether BP c-commands AP is in fact moot.

(The above is not an exhaustive list of c-command relations in the tree, but covers all of those that are significant in the following exposition.)

Asymmetric c-command is the relation that holds between two categories, A and B, if A c-commands B but B does not c-command A.

== Precedence and asymmetric c-command ==
Informally, Kayne's theory states that if a nonterminal category A asymmetrically c-commands another nonterminal category B, all the terminal nodes dominated by A must precede all of the terminal nodes dominated by B (this statement is commonly referred to as the "Linear Correspondence Axiom" or LCA). Moreover, this principle must suffice to establish a complete and consistent ordering of all terminal nodes — if it cannot consistently order all of the terminal nodes in a tree, the tree is illicit. Consider the following tree:

(S and S' may either be simplex structures like BP, or complex structures with specifiers and complements like CP.)

In this tree, the set of pairs of nonterminal categories such that the first member of the pair asymmetrically c-commands the second member is: ⟨BP, A⟩, ⟨BP, CP⟩, ⟨A, CP⟩. This gives rise to the total ordering: ⟨b, a, c⟩.

As a result, there is no right adjunction, and hence in practice no rightward movement either. Furthermore, the underlying order must be specifier-head-complement.

== Derivation of X-bar theory ==
The example tree in the first section of this article is in accordance with X-bar theory (with the exception that [Spec,CP] (i.e., the specifier of the CP phrase) is treated as an adjunct). It can be seen that removing any of the structures in the tree (e.g., deleting the C dominating the 'c' terminal, so that the complement of A is [CP c]) will destroy the asymmetric c-command relations necessary for linearly ordering the terminals of the tree.

== The universal order ==
Kayne notes that his theory permits either a universal specifier-head-complement order or a universal complement-head-specifier order, depending on whether asymmetric c-command establishes precedence or subsequence (S-H-C results from precedence). He prefers S-H-C as the universal underlying order since the most widely attested order in linguistic typology is for specifiers to precede heads and complements (though the order of heads and complements themselves is relatively free). He further argues that a movement approach to deriving non-S-H-C orders is appropriate since it derives asymmetries in typology (such as the fact that "verb-second" languages such as German are not mirrored by any known "verb second-from-last" languages).

== Derived orders: the case of Japanese wh-questions ==
Perhaps the biggest challenge for antisymmetry is to explain the wide variety of different surface orders across languages. Any deviation from Spec-Head-Comp order (which implies overall Subject-Verb-Object order, if objects are complements) must be explained by movement. Kayne argues that in some cases the need for extra movements (previously unnecessary because different underlying orders were assumed for different languages) can explain some otherwise mysterious typological generalizations. His explanation for the lack of wh-movement in Japanese is the most striking example of this. From the mid-1980s onwards, the standard analysis of wh-movement involved the wh-phrase moving leftward to a position on the left edge of the clause called [Spec,CP]. Thus, a derivation of the English question What did John buy? would proceed roughly as follows:

[CP {Spec,CP position} John did buy what]

wh-movement →

[CP What did John buy]

The Japanese equivalent of this sentence is as follows (note the lack of wh-movement):

John-wa nani-o kaimashita ka
John-TOP what-ACC bought Q
'What did John buy'

Japanese has an overt "question particle" (ka), which appears at the end of the sentence in questions. It is generally assumed that languages such as English have a "covert" (i.e. phonologically null) equivalent of this particle in the 'C' position of the clause — the position just to the right of [Spec,CP]. This particle is overtly realised in English by the movement of an auxiliary to C (in the case of the example above, by the movement of did to C). Why is it that this particle is on the left edge of the clause in English, but on the right edge in Japanese? Kayne suggests that in Japanese, the whole of the clause (apart from the question particle in C) has moved to the [Spec,CP] position. So, the structure for the Japanese example above is something like the following:

[CP [John-wa nani-o kaimashita] C ka

Now it is clear why Japanese does not have wh-movement — the [Spec,CP] position is already filled, so no wh-phrase can move to it. The relationship between surface word order and the possibility of wh-movement is seemingly obscure. A possible alternative to the antisymmetric explanation could be based on the difficulty of parsing languages with rightward movement.

== Dynamic antisymmetry ==
Andrea Moro proposed Dynamic antisymmetry, a weak version of antisymmetry, which allows the generation of non-LCA compatible structures (points of symmetry) before the hierarchical structure is linearized at Phonetic Form (PF). The unwanted structures are then rescued by movement: deleting the phonetic content of the moved element neutralizes the linearization problem. Dynamic Antisymmetry aims at unifying a movement and phrase structure, which otherwise are independent properties.

== Antisymmetry and ternary branching ==
Kayne proposed recasting the antisymmetry of natural language as a condition of "Merge", the operation which combines two elements into one. Kayne proposes that merging a head H and its complement C yields an ordered pair $\langle H,C \rangle$ (rather than the standard symmetric set {H,C}). $\langle H,C \rangle$ involves immediate temporal precedence (or immediate linear precedence) so that H immediately precedes (i-precedes) C. Kayne proposes furthermore that when a specifier S merges, it forms an ordered pair with the head directly, $\langle S,H \rangle$, or S i-precedes H. Invoking i-precedence prevents more than two elements from merging with H; only one element can i-precede H (the specifier), and H can i-precede only one element (the complement).

Kayne notes that $\langle S,H \rangle,\langle H,C \rangle$ is not mappable to a tree structure, since H would have two mothers, and that it has the consequence that $\langle S,H \rangle$ and $\langle H,C \rangle$ would seem to be constituents. He suggests that $\langle S,H \rangle,\langle H,C \rangle$ is replaced by $\langle S,H,C \rangle$, "with an ordered triple replacing the two ordered pairs and then being mappable to a ternary-branching tree" (pp. 17). Kayne goes on to say, "This would lead to seeing my [(1981)] arguments for binary branching to have two subcomponents, the first being the claim that syntax is n-ary branching with n having a single value, the second being that that value is 2. Mapping [$\langle S,H \rangle,\langle H,C \rangle$ to $\langle S,H,C \rangle$] would retain the first subcomponent and replace 2 by 3 in the second, arguably with no loss in restrictiveness".

== Theoretical arguments ==
Antisymmetry theory rejects the head-directionality parameter as such: it claims that at an underlying level, all languages are head-initial. In fact, it argued that all languages have the underlying order Specifier-Head-Complement. Deviations from this order are accounted for by different syntactic movements applied by languages.

Kayne argues that a theory that allows both directionalities would state that languages are symmetrical, whereas in fact languages are found to be asymmetrical in many respects. Examples of linguistic asymmetries which may be cited in support of the theory (although they do not concern head direction) are:

- Hanging topics appear at the start of sentences, as in "Henry – I've known that guy for a long time". They are not found at the end of sentences.
- Number agreement is stronger when the noun phrase precedes the verb (Greenberg's Universal 33). Examples of this are found in English sentences such as There's books on the table, where the verb frequently fails to agree with the following plural noun, and in French and Italian compound tenses, where the past participle may agree with a preceding direct object but not with the following one.
- Relative clauses that precede the noun (as in Chinese and Japanese) tend to differ from those that follow the noun: they more often lack complementizers (akin to English that) or relative pronouns and are more likely to be non-finite (this can be found, for example, in Quechuan languages.)
- Other areas in which asymmetries are found, according to Kayne, include clitics and clitic dislocation, serial verb constructions, coordination, and forward and backward pronominalization.

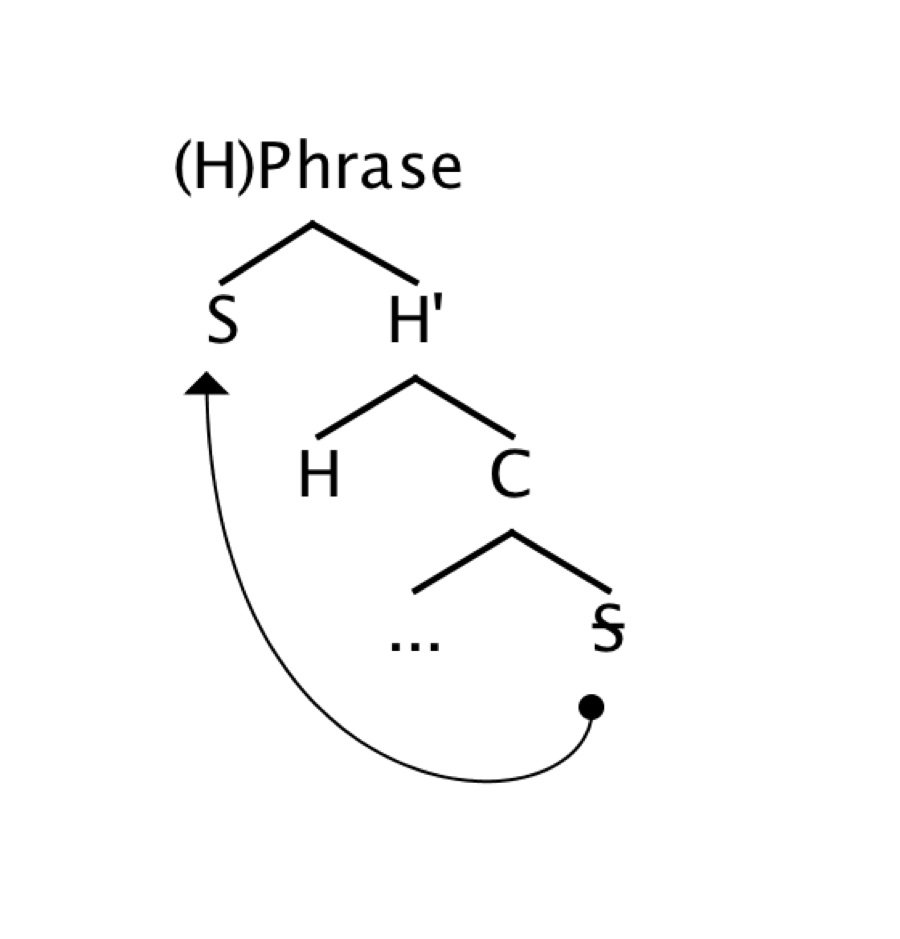
X-bar syntactic tree showing the movement of the specifier (S) relative to the head (H) and complement (C)

In arguing for a universal underlying Head-Complement order, Kayne uses the concept of a probe-goal search (based on the Minimalist program). The idea of probes and goals in syntax is that a head acts as a probe and looks for a goal, namely its complement. Kayne proposes that the direction of the probe-goal search must share the direction of language parsing and production. Parsing and production proceed in a left-to-right direction: the beginning of the sentence is heard or spoken first, and the end of the sentence is heard or spoken last. This implies (according to the theory) an ordering whereby probe comes before the goal, i.e. head precedes complement.

Kayne's theory also addresses the position of the specifier of a phrase. He represents the relevant scheme as follows:

S H [_{c}...~~S~~...]

The specifier, at first internal to the complement, is moved to the unoccupied position to the left of the head. In terms of merged pairs, this structure can also be represented as:

⟨S, H⟩ ⟨H, C⟩

This process can be mapped onto X-bar syntactic trees as shown in the adjacent diagram.

Antisymmetry then leads to a universal Specifier-Head-Complement order. The varied ordering found in human languages are explained by syntactic movement away from this underlying base order. It has been pointed out, though, that in predominantly head-final languages such as Japanese and Basque, this would involve complex and massive leftward movement, which violates the ideal of grammatical simplicity. An example of the type of movement scheme that would need to be envisaged is provided by Tokizaki:

1. [_{CP} C [_{IP} ... [_{VP} V [_{PP} P [_{NP} N [_{Genitive} Affix Stem]]]]]]
2. [_{CP} C [_{IP} ... [_{VP} V [_{PP} P [_{NP} N [_{Genitive} Stem Affix]]]]]]
3. [_{CP} C [_{IP} ... [_{VP} V [_{PP} P [_{NP} [_{Genitive} Stem Affix] N]]]]]
4. [_{CP} C [_{IP} ... [_{VP} V [_{PP} [_{NP} [_{Genitive} Stem Affix] N] P]]]]
5. [_{CP} C [_{IP} ... [_{VP} [_{PP} [_{NP} [_{Genitive} Stem Affix] N] P] V]]]
6. [_{CP} [_{IP} ... [_{VP} [_{PP} [_{NP} [_{Genitive} Stem Affix] N] P] V]] C]

Here, at each phrasal level in turn, the head of the phrase moves from left to right position relative to its complement. The eventual result reflects the ordering of complex nested phrases found in languages such as Japanese.

An attempt to provide evidence for Kayne's scheme is made by Lin, who considered Standard Chinese sentences with the sentence-final particle le. This particle is taken to convey perfect aspectual meaning, and thus to be the head of an aspect phrase having the verb phrase as its complement. If phrases are always essentially head-initial, then a case like this must entail movement, since the particle comes after the verb phrase. It is proposed that there the complement moves into specifier position, which precedes the head.

As evidence for this, Lin considers wh-adverbials such as zenmeyang ("how?"). Based on prior work by James Huang, it is postulated that (a) adverbials of this type are subject to movement at logical form (LF) level (even though, in Chinese, they do not display wh-movement at surface level); and (b) movement is not possible from within a non-complement (Huang's Condition on Extraction Domain or CED). This would imply that zenmeyang could not appear in a verb phrase with sentence-final le, assuming the above analysis, since that verb phrase has moved into a non-complement (specifier) position, and thus further movement (such as that which zenmeyang is required to undergo at LF level) is not possible. Such a restriction on the occurrence of zenmeyang is indeed found:

Zhangsan zenmeyang xiu che?
Zhangsan how repair car
"How does Zhangsan repair the car?"

* Zhangsan zenmeyang xiu che le?
{} Zhangsan how repair car PF
("How has Zhangsan repaired the car?")

Sentence (b), in which zenmeyang co-occurs with sentence-final le, is ungrammatical. Lin cites this and other related findings as evidence that the above analysis is correct, supporting the view that Chinese aspect phrases are deeply head-initial.

=== Surface true approach ===
According to the "surface true" viewpoint, analysis of head direction must take place at the level of surface derivations, or even the Phonetic Form, i.e. the order in which sentences are pronounced in natural speech. This rejects the idea of an underlying ordering that is then subject to movement. In a 2008 article, Marc Richards argued that a head parameter must only reside at PF, as it is unmaintainable in its original form as a structural parameter. In this approach the relative positions of head and complement that are found at this surface level, which show variation both between and within languages (see above), must be treated as the "true" orderings.

=== Existence of true head-final languages ===
Takita argues against the conclusion of Kayne's Antisymmetry Theory, which states that all languages are head-initial at an underlying level. He claims that a language such as Japanese is truly head-final since the mass movement required to take an underlying head-initial structure to the head-final ones actually found in such languages would violate other constraints. It is implied that such languages are likely following a head-final parameter value, as originally conceived. (For a head-initial/Antisymmetry analysis of Japanese, see Kayne.)

Takita's argument is based on Lin's analysis of Chinese. Since surface head-final structures are derived from underlying head-initial structures by moving the complements, further extraction from within the moved complement violates CED.

One of the examples of movement that Takita looks at is that of VP-fronting in Japanese. Grammatically, the sentence without VP-fronting, (a), and the sentence where the VP moves to the matrix clause, (b), do not significantly differ.

[_{CP1} Taro-ga [_{CP2}[_{IP2} Hanako-ga [_{VP2} hon-o sute]-sae shita to] omotteiru]
{} Taro-NOM {} Hanako-NOM {} book-ACC discard-even did C‍ think
'Taro thinks [that Hanako [even discarded his books]]'
(Takita 2009 57: (33a)

[_{CP1}[_{VP2} Hon-o sute]-sae_{i} Taro-ga [_{CP2}[_{IP2} Hanako-ga shita] to] omotteiru
{} book-ACC discard-even Taro-NOM {} Hanako-NOM did C‍ think
'[Even discarded his books], Taro thinks [that Hanako did t_{i}]'
(Takita 2009 57: (33b)

In (b), the fronted VP precedes the matrix subject, confirming that the VP is located in the matrix clause. If Japanese were head-initial, (b) should not be grammatical because it allows for the extraction of an element (VP2) from the moved complement (CP2).

Thus Takita shows that surface head-final structures in Japanese do not block movement, as they do in Chinese. He concludes that, because it does not block movement as shown in previous sections, Japanese is a genuinely head-final language, and not derived from an underlying, head-initial structure. These results imply that Universal Grammar involves binary head-directionality, and is not antisymmetric. Takita briefly applies the same tests to Turkish, another seemingly head-final language, and reports similar results.

== Sources ==
- Kayne, Richard S. (1994). The Antisymmetry of Syntax. Linguistic Inquiry Monograph Twenty-Five. MIT Press. ISBN 978-0262611077.
- Kayne, Richard S. (February 12, 2010). Why are there no directionality parameters?. 28th West Coast Conference on Formal Linguistics. University of Southern California. ISBN 978-1-57473-441-6.
- Takita, Kensuke (February 2009). "If Chinese is head-initial, Japanese cannot be". Journal of East Asian Linguistics. 18 (1): 41–61. doi:10.1007/s10831-009-9038-z. ISSN 0925-8558. S2CID 121661611.
