= Task (teaching style) =

The Task teaching style is an option available to students under Student-Directed Teaching, a progressive teaching technology that aims to give students a greater sense of ownership in their education.

This teaching style is "for those students who require formal instruction and yet are capable of making some choice as to the appropriate practice for them to master the objective." This formal instruction happens at the same time as the Command of students.

Under Task, the teacher will:

- Provide a unit plan consisting of the objectives for several days, written in a language that students can understand
- Provide formal instruction
- Limit formal instruction to 25% of the time
- Provide an instruction area
- Assign an appropriate amount of choice in practice related to the instruction
- Provide a checking station with answer keys
- Use good questioning techniques and negotiation to help steer the students to become more independent
- Spend approximately 60% of the total class time with the students whose choice was Task (remember, Command and Task are together for formal instruction)
- Provide perception checks and final tests as indicated in the unit plan
- Provide a second evaluative activity if required by an individual student

The student will:

- Listen to the instructions
- Consider what they know and what they don't know when selecting the amount and type of practice
- Declare the mark expected on each perception check
- Do more than one perception check if the declared mark is not reached within the flexibility factor

Assignments for students choosing the Task style might look something like this:

On page 159, there are some practice questions. Do any 3 of the first 5, any 2 of the following 5, and any 4 of the next 10.
