= The Command =

The Command may refer to:

- "The Command" (short story) a 1938 short story by L. Sprague de Camp
- The Command (comic) part of the series Fifty State Initiative, a fictional governmental plan that appears in comic books published by Marvel Comics
- The Command (1954 film) a cavalry Western starring Guy Madison
- The Command (2005 film)
- The Command, the US release title of Kursk (film), a 2018 submarine disaster film

== See also ==
- Command (disambiguation)
