= Andrea Moro =

Italian linguist

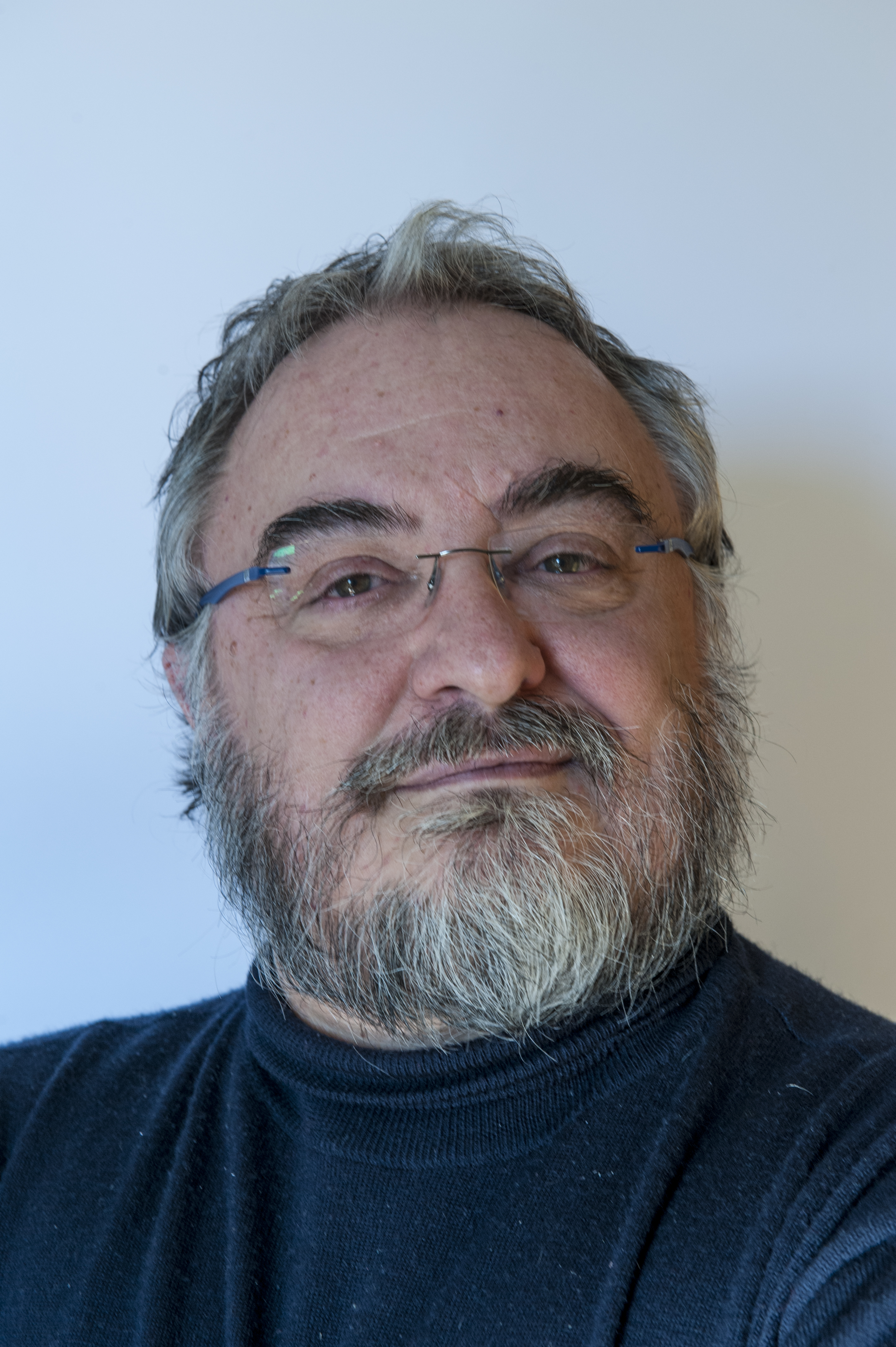
- Moro, 2019
- Born: Andrea Carlo Moro; 24 July 1962 (age 64); Pavia, Italy
- Education: University of Padua; University of Pavia
- Known for: Inverse copular sentences Dynamic Antisymmetry neurolinguistics impossible languages
- Scientific career
- Fields: linguistics neuroscience
- Workplaces: University School for Advanced Studies IUSS, Pavia (Italy)
- Doctoral advisor: Guglielmo Cinque
- Website: orcid.org/0000-0002-6602-5871

Andrea Carlo Moro (Italian: [ˈmɔːro]; born 24 July 1962) is an Italian linguist, neuroscientist and novelist.

He is currently full professor of general linguistics at the Institute for Advanced Study IUSS Pavia and the Scuola Normale Superiore in Pisa, Italy, and founder and former director of NeTS and of the Department of Cognitive Behavioural and Social Sciences. He studied at the University of Pavia for his laurea, then he got a Ph.D. at the University of Padua; he has been a visiting scientist several times at MIT, first with a Fulbright grant, then at Harvard. He was a professor at the University of Bologna and the Università Vita-Salute San Raffaele. He is a member of the Accademia Nazionale dei Lincei, of the Academia Europaea and the Pontifical Academy of Fine Arts and Letters of the Virtuosi al Pantheon. He was awarded Commander for the Order of Merit of the Italian Republic, the highest-ranking honour of the Republic.

== Academic biography ==
Moro's main fields of research are syntax and neurolinguistics. He has pursued at least two distinct lines of research: the theory of syntax and the neurological correlates of syntax with the brain. For the first field, see the critical comments of Graffi (2000), Hale - Keyser (2003), Kayne (2011), Richards (2010) and Chomsky (2013) among others. As for a critical evaluation of the second field see in particular the first chapter of Kandel et al. (2013); see also Kaan, 2002, Marcus 2003 and Newmeyer (2005). By referring to these sources, one can synthetically outline Andrea Moro's work in the two fields as follows.

In the first field, he contributed to the theory of clause structure (in particular with respect to the theory of the copula), discovering inverse copular constructions, to the notion of expletive proposing that an element like "there" and its equivalent across languages is a raised expletive predicate rather than an inserted expletive subject, and to the theory of syntactic movement (by proposing a weak version of the theory of antisymmetry, i.e. dynamic antisymmetry) according to which movement is the effect of a symmetry-breaking process in the computational system that underlies syntax. As for the first topic, the original reference is the volume "The Raising of Predicates" (1997, Cambridge University Press) - chapter 1 and 2, in particular - which has received more than 1236 citations, according to Google Scholar, whose popularised version is now accessible in English as "A Brief History of the verb to BE" (2017, MIT Press); as for the second, instead, the original reference is the monograph "Dynamic Antisymmetry" (MIT Press) which has received circa 500 references, again according to Google Scholar.

As for the other field, he explored the neurological correlates of artificial languages which do not follow the principles of Universal Grammar providing evidence that Universal Grammar properties cannot be cultural, social or conventional artefacts: in fact, he and the team of people he worked with showed that recursive syntactic rules, that is rules based on recursion selectively activate a neurological network (including Broca's area) whereas non-recursive syntactic rules do not. These discoveries have appeared in a few international Journals, including, for example, Nature Neuroscience (Musso, Moro et al. 2003) or PNAS (Moro 2010): a comprehensive collection of the works in both fields has now become available in the "Routledge Leading Linguist Series" as "The Equilibrium of Human Syntax" (Routledge 2013). He also explored the correlates between the representation of the world in the brain and the structure of syntax, specifically the relationship between sentential negation and the brain) also available in Moro 2013.

In recent papers, he took a position against the idea that the sequence of human actions can be described as having the same structure as the sequence of words in a well-formed syntactic structure. Furthermore, Moro pursued the study of the relationship between the brain and language by exploiting electrophysiological measure. The core of the experiment - done in a team with neurosurgeons and electric engineers - consists in comparing the shape of the electric waves of non-acoustic language areas (typically, Broca's area) with the shape of the corresponding sound waves. The result was that not only do the shape of the two different waves correlate but they do so also in the absence of sound production, that is during inner speech activity, opening the possibility of reading linguistic expression from the direct measure of the cortex and skipping the actual utterance of the sentence. For a non-technical synthesis of these discoveries and a critical discussion see "Impossible Languages" which received the honourable mention at the PROSE Awards. For Moro's view on the relationship between mind and language and for evolution of language and related issues see Everaert et al. (2017) and Friederici et al. (2017). A further step into the correlation between grammar and brain electrophysiological activity, Moro participated in a study pursued with the Stereoelectroencephalography (SEEG) tracking different syntactic structures in homophonous phrases un high gamma activity; in other words, this experiment was able to highlight the electrophysiological activity of verb phrases vs. noun phrases while crucially factoring sound out. This was done by exploiting sequences of words with the same sound but different syntactic structure

In his essay "La razza e la lingua" he offers arguments against racism showing that there exist two ideas which look innocuous if considered as separated but which are extremely dangerous if combined: first, that there are languages which are better than others; second, that reality is perceived and thought differently, according to the language one speaks. He highlights that this linguistic racism was at the origin of the myth of Aryan race and the devastating results it had on civilisation.

In his book "The secrets of words" he discusses with Noam Chomsky some crucial aspects of the relationship between the brain and language. In particular, the notion of impossible languages is highlighted and its impact on neuroscience and epistemology in general is illustrated. The core idea is that humans ignore the only indisputable fact concerning language, namely its linear structure, and compute grammar on the sole basis of hierarchical structures recursively generated. The core argument is taken from those experiments conceived by Moro who designed artificial languages based on linear order and showed that the brain progressively inhibits those networks which are canonically reserved for language. In his last book he illustrates Lucretius's masterpiece De rerum natura view of language: first, as a tool to describe the atomic structure of the world; then, as an object to explain its origin.

His first novel is "Il segreto di Pietramala" a thriller concerning a lost language which is able to kill. For this novel, Andrea Moro was awarded the Flaiano Prizes (Italian: Premio Flaiano) for literature in July 2018. An English translation of this novel came out in 2023. His second novel describes love and friendship, vendetta and murder starting from the struggle of two theater companies deflagrating in Milano in 1978 and ending in Genève. The plot is based on a semi-transcription of the Iliad where the actors turn out to live the same feelings as the characters of the poem.

== Novels ==
- Moro, Andrea (2024). "Cinquantun giorni". La Nave di Teseo.
- Moro, Andrea (2018). Il segreto di Pietramala. La Nave di Teseo. ASIN B0C9TXJG1Z.
- Moro, Andrea (2018). The secret of Pietramala. La Nave di Teseo. ISBN 978-8893444095.

== Selected scientific works ==
- Bulhuis, Johan; Crain, Stephen; Fong, Sandiway; Moro, Andrea (2024). "Three reasons why AI doesn't model human language". Nature. 627 (8004): 489. Bibcode:2024Natur.627..489B. doi:10.1038/d41586-024-00824-z. PMID 38503912.

- Moro, Andrea (2025). Lucretius and the bat with blue eyes. Explaining the universe with the alphabet. MIT Press. ISBN 9780262554015.
- Chomsky, Noam; Moro, Andrea (2022). The secrets of words. MIT Press. ISBN 9780262046718.
- Artoni, Fiorenzo; d'Orio, Piergiorgio; Catricalà, Eleonora; Conca, Francesca; Bottoni, Franco; Pelliccia, Veronica; Sartori, Ivana; Lo Russo, Giorgio; Cappa, Stefano; Micera, Silvestro; Moro, Andrea (5 May 2020). "High gamma response tracks different syntactic structures in homophonous phrases". Scientific Reports. 10 (1): 7537. Bibcode:2020NatSR..10.7537A. doi:10.1038/s41598-020-64375-9. PMC 7200802. PMID 32372065.
- Moro, Andrea (2019). La razza e la lingua. La Nave di Teseo. ISBN 978-8834600238.
- Moro, Andrea (2017). Brief History of the verb To BE. MIT Press. ISBN 9780262037129.
- Moro, Andrea (2016). Impossible Languages. MIT Press. ISBN 978-0-262-03489-0.
- Moro, Andrea (2008). The Boundaries of Babel: The Brain and the Enigma of Impossible Languages. MIT Press. ISBN 978-0-262-13498-9. Archived from the original on 2012-10-07.
- Moro, Andrea (2000). Dynamic Antisymmetry. MIT Press. ISBN 978-0-262-13375-3.
- Moro, Andrea (1997). The raising of predicates. Predicative noun phrases and the theory of clause structure. Cambridge University Press. ISBN 978-0-521-02478-5.
- Tettamanti, Marco; Manenti, Rosa; Della Rosa, Pasquale A.; Falini, Andrea; Perani, Daniela; Cappa, Stefano F.; Moro, Andrea (2008). "Negation in the brain: Modulating action representations". NeuroImage. 43 (2): 358–67. doi:10.1016/j.neuroimage.2008.08.004. hdl:11384/163588. PMID 18771737. S2CID 17658822.
- Musso, Mariacristina; Moro, Andrea; Glauche, Volkmar; Rijntjes, Michel; Reichenbach, Jürgen; Büchel, Christian; Weiller, Cornelius (2003). "Broca's area and the language instinct". Nature Neuroscience. 6 (7): 774–81. doi:10.1038/nn1077. PMID 12819784. S2CID 7955526.
- Moro, Andrea (2010). Breve storia del verbo essere: Viaggio al centro della frase. Adelphi. ISBN 978-88-459-2493-4.
- Moro, Andrea (2011). "A closer look at the turtle's eyes". Proceedings of the National Academy of Sciences. 108 (6): 2177–8. Bibcode:2011PNAS..108.2177M. doi:10.1073/pnas.1019723108. PMC 3038720. PMID 21282626.
- Moro, Andrea (2013). The Equilibrium of Human Syntax: Symmetries in the Brain. Routledge Leading Linguists. New York: Routledge. ISBN 978-0-415-63967-5.
- Moro, Andrea (2014). "On the similarity between syntax and actions". Trends in Cognitive Sciences. 18 (3): 109–10. doi:10.1016/j.tics.2013.11.006. PMID 24370077. S2CID 32898315.
- Moro, Andrea (2014). "Response to Pulvermueller: the syntax of actions and other metaphors". Trends in Cognitive Sciences. 18 (5): 221. doi:10.1016/j.tics.2014.01.012. PMID 24593981. S2CID 205395586.
- Magrassi; Aromataris; Cabrini; Annovazz-Lodi; Moro (2015). "Language representation in higher language areas during language generation". PNAS. 18 (6): 1868–1873. Bibcode:2015PNAS..112.1868M. doi:10.1073/pnas.1418162112. PMC 4330766. PMID 25624479.
- Everaert, Huybregts; Berwick; Chomsky; Tattersall; Moro; Bolhuis (2017). "What is language and how could it have evolved?". Trends in Cognitive Sciences. 21 (8): 1–21. doi:10.1016/j.tics.2017.05.007. hdl:1721.1/128683. PMID 28619240. S2CID 34281004.
- Friederici; Chomsky; Berwick; Moro; Bolhuis (2017). "Language, mind and Brain". PNAS. 1 (10): 713–722. doi:10.1038/s41562-017-0184-4. PMID 31024099. S2CID 22761576.

== Sources ==
- Kandel, Eric; Schwartz, James; Jessell, Thomas; Siegelbaum, Steven; Hudspeth, A.J., eds. (2012). Principles of Neural Science (5th ed.). New York: McGraw Hill. ISBN 978-0-07-139011-8.
- Chomsky, Noam (1995). The Minimalist Program. Cambridge, Massachusetts: MIT Press. ISBN 978-0-262-53128-3.
- Chomsky, Noam (2004). The Generative Enterprise Revisited: Discussions with Riny Huybregts, Henk van Riemsdijk, Naoki Fukui and Mihoko Zushi. ISBN 978-3-11-018001-5.
- Chomsky, Noam (2013). "Problems of projection". Lingua. 130: 33–49. doi:10.1016/j.lingua.2012.12.003. S2CID 3060970.
- Everaert, Martin; van Riemsdijk, Henk, eds. (2005). The Blackwell Companion to Syntax, Volume IV. Oxford: Wiley-Blackwell. ISBN 978-1-4051-1485-1.
- Marcus, Gary F; Vouloumanos, Athena; Sag, Ivan A (2003). "Does Broca's play by the rules?". Nature Neuroscience. 6 (7): 651–2. doi:10.1038/nn0703-651. PMID 12830149. S2CID 8814684.
- Kayne, Richard S. (2011). "Why Are There No Directionality Parameters?". In Washburn, Mary Byram; McKinney-Bock, Katherine; Varis, Erika; Sawyer, Ann; Tomaszewicz, Barbara (eds.). Proceedings of the 28th West Coast Conference on Formal Linguistics. Cascadilla Press. pp. 1–23. ISBN 978-1-57473-441-6.
- Graffi, Giorgio (2000). 200 Years of Syntax: A Critical Survey. Amsterdam: John Benjamins. ISBN 978-90-272-4587-8.
- Newmeyer, Frederick J. (2005). Possible and Probable Languages: A Generative Perspective on Linguistic Typology. Oxford, England: Oxford University Press. ISBN 978-0-19-927434-5.
- den Dikken, Marcel (2006). Relators And Linkers: The Syntax of Predication, Predicate Inversion, and Copulas. Cambridge, Massachusetts: MIT Press. ISBN 978-0-262-04231-4.
- Richards, Norvin (2010). Uttering Trees. Cambridge, Massachusetts: MIT Press. ISBN 978-0-262-51371-5.
- Hale, Ken; Keyser, Samuel Jay (2003). Prolegomenon To A Theory Of Argument Structure. Cambridge, Massachusetts: MIT Press. ISBN 978-0-262-26305-4.
- Kaan, Edith; Swaab, Tamara Y. (2002). "The brain circuitry of syntactic comprehension". Trends in Cognitive Sciences. 6 (8): 350–356. doi:10.1016/S1364-6613(02)01947-2. PMID 12140086. S2CID 18668619.
- Chomsky, Noam (2013). "Problems of projection". Lingua. 130: 33–49. doi:10.1016/j.lingua.2012.12.003. S2CID 3060970.
- Berwick, Robert C.; Friederici, Angela D.; Chomsky, Noam; Bolhuis, Johan J. (2013). "Evolution, brain, and the nature of language". Trends in Cognitive Sciences. 17 (2): 89–98. doi:10.1016/j.tics.2012.12.002. PMID 23313359. S2CID 14945508.
