= Ningombam Bupenda Meitei =

Indian writer (born 1987)

- Meitei in Dehradun
- Born: 6 April 1987 (age 39); Imphal, Manipur, India
- Education: St. Stephen's College, Delhi
- Occupations: Writer, teacher

Ningombam Bupenda Meitei (born 6 April 1987) is an Indian writer, essayist and poet in English and Meitei languages.

== Early life ==
Ningombam Bupenda Meitei was born in Imphal, Manipur to the descendant of Maharaja Kullachandra of Manipur whose royal throne was recognised by the Viceroy of India, Lord Lansdowne. He went to Sainik School Imphal and St. Stephen's College, Delhi, University of Delhi.

== Career ==
He taught philosophy at Hindu College, University of Delhi. He also taught physics and mathematics in Dehradun as a school teacher. He has composed many poems besides writing in philosophy and philosophy of physics. He is a member of International Network in Biolinguistics in which Prof. Noam Chomsky is also a member.

== Works ==
- A countryside's innocent heart (2013), published by Lulu, is a collection of poems composed by the poet since his childhood. It took almost fifteen years to complete the book.
- Philosophical writings of a physics student (2013), published by Notion Press, is a collection of his philosophical articles.
- How Rahul Gandhi kept democracy in Manipur safe from Modi.

== The Nehruvian ==
He founded The Nehruvian on the birth anniversary of Indira Gandhi, 19 November 2015, in Imphal, Manipur. The Nehruvian aims to spread the philosophy of Jawaharlal Nehru, the first Prime Minister of an independent India.

== Political career ==
He joined Indian National Congress as chairperson, Social Media and Spokesperson of the party in Manipur Pradesh Congress Committee. Subsequently, Congress President Rahul Gandhi appointed him as Regional Coordinator and asked him to look after the affairs of All India Fishermen Congress under All India Congress Committee in the eight states of North Eastern region of India. Presently, he is the party's spokesperson and media panellist in Manipur.

== See also ==
- International Network in Biolinguistics
