= The Minimalist Program =

1995 book by Noam Chomsky

- Author: Noam Chomsky
- Language: English
- Subject: Linguistics
- Publisher: MIT Press
- Publication date: September 1995
- Publication place: Cambridge, Massachusetts
- Media type: Print (Hardcover and Paperback)
- Pages: 426
- ISBN: 9780262032292

The Minimalist Program is a 1995 book on linguistics by Noam Chomsky. It is a collection of four technical papers published throughout the early 1990s. In chapters 3 and 4 of the book, Chomsky introduces the Minimalist program, revising and discarding many concepts that emerged under his previous Principles and Parameters framework, including D-structure, the Extended projection principle, government, and X-bar theory.

== Publication ==
The Minimalist Program was first published in 1995, but its first three chapters were reprinted articles from earlier publications. Chapter 1, written jointly by Chomsky and Howard Lasnik, was first published in 1993 for a general handbook on syntax. Chapter 2 was written in 1988 and first published in 1991. Chapter 3 was written in 1992 and first published in 1993. Chapter 4, the longest chapter of The Minimalist Program, was based on a 1994 work by Chomsky, but with substantial revisions and additions.

In 2015, MIT Press published a 20th anniversary edition of The Minimalist Program together with a 50th anniversary edition of Aspects of the Theory of Syntax, another one of Chomsky's significant contributions to linguistic theory.

== Reception ==
The Minimalist Program has received positive reviews. In a 1998 review, Jan-Wouter Zwart called the book "a masterpiece" and "a major contribution in groundwork for a new stage in syntactic theorizing, in detailed presentation of the kind of questions that can be asked and the kind of results that may be obtained." In a 1997 review, Robert Freidin wrote that the book "may well herald a third major breakthrough in the study of language and mind"; Freidin remarks that the first three chapters alone would be Chomsky's "richest and most complex collection of essays", but chapter 4 "raises MP [The Minimalist Program] to another level entirely."
