= Case government =

Grammatical term

In linguistics, case government is a type of government wherein a verb or adposition imposes grammatical case requirements on its noun phrase complement. For example, in German the preposition für 'for' governs the accusative case: für mich 'for me-accusative'. Case government may modify the meaning of the verb substantially, even to meanings that are unrelated.

Case government is an important notion in languages with many case distinctions, such as Russian and Finnish. It plays less of a role in English, because English does not rely on grammatical cases, except for distinguishing subject pronouns (I, he, she, we, they) from other pronouns (me, him, her, us, them). In English, true case government is absent, but if the aforementioned subject pronouns are understood as regular pronouns in the accusative case, it occurs in sentences such as He found me (not for example *He found I).

== Adpositions ==
In Standard German, there are prepositions that govern each of the three oblique cases: accusative, dative, and genitive. Case-marking in German is largely observed on elements that modify the noun (e.g. determiners, adjectives). In the following table, the examples of Löffel 'spoon' (masculine), Messer 'knife' (neuter), and Gabel 'fork' (feminine) are in definite noun phrases for each of the four cases. In the oblique cases (i.e. non-Nominative), the prepositions supplied dictate different cases: ohne 'without' governs the accusative, mit 'with' governs the dative, and wegen 'because of' governs the genitive: (Note: The increasing rarity of the genitive in colloquial speech causes prepositions governing the genitive to take on the dative colloquially.)

Case	Gender		
Case	Masculine	Neuter	Feminine
Nominative	der Löffel the.M.NOM.SG spoon.NOM.SG 'the spoon'	das Messer the.N.NOM.SG knife.NOM.SG 'the knife'	die Gabel the.F.NOM.SG fork.NOM.SG 'the fork'
Accusative	ohne den Löffel without the.M.ACC.SG spoon.ACC.SG 'without the spoon'	ohne das Messer without the.N.ACC.SG knife.ACC.SG 'without the knife'	ohne die Gabel without the.F.ACC.SG fork.ACC.SG 'without the fork'
Dative	mit dem Löffel with the.M.DAT.SG spoon.DAT.SG 'with the spoon'	mit dem Messer with the.N.DAT.SG knife.DAT.SG 'with the knife'	mit der Gabel with the.F.DAT.SG fork.DAT.SG 'with the fork'
Genitive	wegen des Löffels {because of} the.M.GEN.SG spoon-M.GEN.SG 'because of the spoon'	wegen des Messer-s {because of} the.N.GEN.SG knife-N.GEN.SG 'because of the knife'	wegen der Gabel {because of} the.F.GEN.SG fork.F.GEN.SG 'because of the fork'

There are also two-way prepositions that govern the dative when the prepositional phrase denotes location (where at?) but the accusative when it denotes direction (to/from where?):

in seinem Palast
in his.M.DAT.SG palace.DAT.SG
'in his palace'

in seinen Palast
in his.M.ACC.SG palace.ACC.SG
'into his palace'

== Verbs ==
In Finnish, certain verbs or groups of verbs require associated objects to employ particular cases or case-like suffixes regardless of the circumstances in which a case is normally used. For example, certain verbs expressing emotions such as rakastaa (to love), inhota (to hate), and pelätä (to fear) require the use of the partitive case. Thus, "Minä rakastan sinua" (I love you), in which "sinua" is partitive although a complete concrete entity as object would normally take the genitive. A number of verbs associated with sensory perception such as maistua (to taste) and kuulostaa (to sound) use the ablative-like suffix -lta/-ltä: "Jäätelö maistuu hyvältä" (Ice cream tastes good). Also, certain verbs referring to interests or hobbies such as pitää (to like) and nauttia (to enjoy) use the elative-like suffix -sta/-stä.

In books on Finnish grammar written in Finnish, case government is usually referred to as "rektio", from the Latin rēctiō (control or governance).

== See also ==
- Government
- Grammatical case
- Theta role
