= Linguistic universal =

Universally-occurring linguistic pattern

A linguistic universal is a pattern that occurs systematically across natural languages, potentially true for all of them. For example, All languages have nouns and verbs, or If a language is spoken, it has consonants and vowels. Research in this area of linguistics is closely tied to the study of linguistic typology, and intends to reveal generalizations across languages, likely tied to cognition, perception, or other abilities of the mind. The field originates from discussions influenced by Noam Chomsky's proposal of a universal grammar, but was largely pioneered by the linguist Joseph Greenberg, who derived a set of forty-five basic universals, mostly dealing with syntax, from a study of some thirty languages.

Though there has been significant research into linguistic universals, in more recent time some linguists, including Nicolas Evans and Stephen C. Levinson, have argued against the existence of absolute linguistic universals that are shared across all languages. These linguists cite problems such as ethnocentrism amongst cognitive scientists, and thus linguists, as well as insufficient research into all of the world's languages in discussions related to linguistic universals, instead promoting these similarities as simply strong tendencies.

== Terminology ==
Linguists distinguish between two kinds of universals: absolute (opposite: statistical, often called tendencies) and implicational (opposite: non-implicational). Absolute universals apply to every known language and are quite few in number; an example is All languages have pronouns. An implicational universal applies to languages with a particular feature that is always accompanied by another feature, such as If a language has trial grammatical number, it also has dual grammatical number, while non-implicational universals just state the existence (or non-existence) of one particular feature.

Also in contrast to absolute universals are tendencies, statements that may not be true for all languages but nevertheless are far too common to be the result of chance. They also have implicational and non-implicational forms. An example of the latter would be The vast majority of languages have nasal consonants. However, most tendencies, like their universal counterparts, are implicational. For example, With overwhelmingly greater-than-chance frequency, languages with normal SOV order are postpositional. Strictly speaking, a tendency is not a kind of universal, but exceptions to most statements called universals can be found. For example, Latin is an SOV language with prepositions. Often it turns out that these exceptional languages are undergoing a shift from one type of language to another. In the case of Latin, its descendant Romance languages switched to SVO, which is a much more common order among prepositional languages.

Universals may also be bidirectional or unidirectional. In a bidirectional universal two features each imply the existence of each other. For example, languages with postpositions usually have SOV order, and likewise SOV languages usually have postpositions. The implication works both ways, and thus the universal is bidirectional. By contrast, in a unidirectional universal the implication works only one way. Languages that place relative clauses before the noun they modify again usually have SOV order, so pre-nominal relative clauses imply SOV. On the other hand, SOV languages worldwide show little preference for pre-nominal relative clauses, and thus SOV implies little about the order of relative clauses. As the implication works only one way, the proposed universal is a unidirectional one.

Linguistic universals in syntax are sometimes held up as evidence for universal grammar (although epistemological arguments are more common). Other explanations for linguistic universals have been proposed, for example, that linguistic universals tend to be properties of language that aid communication. If a language were to lack one of these properties, it has been argued, it would probably soon evolve into a language having that property.

Michael Halliday has argued for a distinction between descriptive and theoretical categories in resolving the matter of the existence of linguistic universals, a distinction he takes from J.R. Firth and Louis Hjelmslev. He argues that "theoretical categories, and their inter-relations construe an abstract model of language...; they are interlocking and mutually defining". Descriptive categories, by contrast, are those set up to describe particular languages. He argues that "When people ask about 'universals', they usually mean descriptive categories that are assumed to be found in all languages. The problem is there is no mechanism for deciding how much alike descriptive categories from different languages have to be before they are said to be 'the same thing'".

== Universal grammar ==
Noam Chomsky's work related to the innateness hypothesis as it pertains to our ability to rapidly learn any language without formal instruction and with limited input, or what he refers to as a poverty of the stimulus, is what began research into linguistic universals. This led to his proposal for a shared underlying grammar structure for all languages, a concept he called universal grammar (UG), which he claimed must exist somewhere in the human brain prior to language acquisition. Chomsky defines UG as "the system of principles, conditions, and rules that are elements or properties of all human languages... by necessity." He states that UG expresses "the essence of human language," and believes that the structure-dependent rules of UG allow humans to interpret and create an infinite number of novel grammatical sentences. Chomsky asserts that UG is the underlying connection between all languages and that the various differences between languages are all relative with respect to UG. He claims that UG is essential to our ability to learn languages, and thus uses it as evidence in a discussion of how to form a potential 'theory of learning' for how humans learn all or most of our cognitive processes throughout our lives. The discussion of Chomsky's UG, its innateness, and its connection to how humans learn language has been one of the more covered topics in linguistics studies to date. However, there is division amongst linguists between those who support Chomsky's claims of UG and those who argued against the existence of an underlying shared grammar structure that can account for all languages.

== Semantics ==
In semantics, research into linguistic universals has taken place in a number of ways. Some linguists, starting with Gottfried Leibniz, have pursued the search for a hypothetic irreducible semantic core of all languages. A modern variant of this approach can be found in the natural semantic metalanguage of Anna Wierzbicka and associates. Other lines of research suggest cross-linguistic tendencies to use body part terms metaphorically as adpositions, or tendencies to have morphologically simple words for cognitively salient concepts. The human body, being a physiological universal, provides an ideal domain for research into semantic and lexical universals. In a seminal study, Cecil H. Brown (1976) proposed a number of universals in the semantics of body part terminology, including the following: in any language, there will be distinct terms for BODY, HEAD, ARM, EYES, NOSE, and MOUTH; if there is a distinct term for FOOT, there will be a distinct term for HAND; similarly, if there are terms for INDIVIDUAL TOES, then there are terms for INDIVIDUAL FINGERS. Subsequent research has shown that most of these features have to be considered cross-linguistic tendencies rather than true universals. Several languages like Tidore and Kuuk Thaayorre lack a general term meaning 'body'. On the basis of such data it has been argued that the highest level in the meronomy of body part terms would be the word for 'person'.

Some other examples of proposed linguistic universals in semantics include the idea that all languages possess words with the meaning '(biological) mother' and 'you (second person singular pronoun)' as well as statistical tendencies of meanings of basic color terms in relation to the number of color terms used by a respective language. Some theories of color naming suggest that if a language possesses only two terms for describing color, their respective meanings will be 'black' and 'white' (or perhaps 'dark' and 'light'), and if a language possesses more than two color terms, then the additional terms will follow trends related to the focal colors, which are determined by the physiology of how color is perceived, rather than linguistics. Thus, if a language possesses three color terms, the third will mean 'red', and if a language possesses four color terms, the next will mean 'yellow' or 'green'. If there are five color terms, then both 'yellow' and 'green' are added, if six, then 'blue' is added, and so on.

== Counterarguments ==
Nicolas Evans and Stephen C. Levinson are two linguists who have written against the existence of linguistic universals, making a particular mention towards issues with Chomsky's proposal for a Universal Grammar. They argue that across the 6,000-8,000 languages spoken around the world today, there are merely strong tendencies rather than universals at best. In their view, these arise primarily due to the fact that many languages are connected to one another through shared historical backgrounds or common lineage, such as group Romance languages in Europe that were all derived from ancient Latin, and therefore it can be expected that they share some core similarities. Evans and Levinson believe that linguists who have previously proposed or supported concepts associated with linguistic universals have done so "under the assumption that most languages are English-like in their structure" and only after analyzing a limited range of languages. They identify ethnocentrism, the idea "that most cognitive scientists, linguists included, speak only familiar European languages, all close cousins in structure," as a possible influence towards the various issues they identify in the assertions made on linguistic universals. With regards to Chomsky's universal grammar, these linguists claim that the explanation of the structure and rules applied to UG are either false due to a lack of detail into the various constructions used when creating or interpreting a grammatical sentence, or that the theory is unfalsifiable due to the vague and oversimplified assertions made by Chomsky. Instead, Evans and Levinson highlight the vast diversity that exists amongst the many languages spoken around the world to advocate for further investigation into the many cross-linguistic variations that do exist. Their article promotes linguistic diversity by citing multiple examples of variation in how "languages can be structured at every level: phonetic, phonological, morphological, syntactic and semantic." They claim that increased understanding and acceptance of linguistic diversity over the concepts of false claims of linguistic universals, better stated to them as strong tendencies, will lead to more enlightening discoveries in the studies of human cognition.

== See also ==
- Conservativity
- Cultural universal
- Greenberg's linguistic universals
- Swadesh list

== Sources ==
- Brown, Cecil H. (1976) "General principles of human anatomical partonomy and speculations on the growth of partonomic nomenclature." American Ethnologist 3, no. 3, Folk Biology, pp. 400–424
- Comrie, Bernard (1981) Language Universals and Linguistic Typology. Chicago: University of Chicago Press.
- Croft, W. (2002). Typology and Universals. Cambridge: Cambridge UP. 2nd ed. ISBN 0-521-00499-3
- Dryer, Matthew S. (1998) "Why Statistical Universals are Better Than Absolute Universals" Chicago Linguistic Society 33: The Panels, pp. 123–145.
- Enfield, Nick J. & Asifa Majid & Miriam van Staden (2006) 'Cross-linguistic categorisation of the body: Introduction' (special issue of Language Sciences).
- Ferguson, Charles A. (1968) 'Historical background of universals research'. In: Greenberg, Ferguson, & Moravcsik, Universals of human languages, pp. 7–31.
- Goddard, Cliff and Wierzbicka, Anna (eds.). 1994. Semantic and Lexical Universals - Theory and Empirical Findings. Amsterdam/Philadelphia: John Benjamins.
- Goddard, Cliff (2002) "The search for the shared semantic core of all languages". In Goddard & Wierzbicka (eds.) Meaning and Universal Grammar - Theory and Empirical Findings volume 1, pp. 5–40, Amsterdam/Philadelphia: John Benjamins.
- Greenberg, Joseph H. (ed.) (1963) Universals of Language. Cambridge, Massachusetts: MIT Press.
- Greenberg, Joseph H. (ed.) (1978a) Universals of Human Language Vol. 4: Syntax. Stanford, California: Stanford University Press.
- Greenberg, Joseph H. (ed.) (1978b) Universals of Human Language Vol. 3: Word Structure. Stanford, California: Stanford University Press.
- Heine, Bernd (1997) Cognitive Foundations of Grammar. New York/Oxford: Oxford University Press.
- Song, Jae Jung (2001) Linguistic Typology: Morphology and Syntax. Harlow, UK: Pearson Education (Longman).
- Song, Jae Jung (ed.) (2011) Oxford Handbook of Linguistic Typology. Oxford: Oxford University Press.
- Rosch, E. & Mervis, C.B. & Gray, W.D. & Johnson, D.M. & Boyes-Braem, P. (1976) 'Basic Objects In Natural Categories', Cognitive Psychology 8-3, 382-439.
- Wilkins, David P. (1993) ‘From part to person: natural tendencies of semantic change and the search for cognates’, Working paper No. 23, Cognitive Anthropology Research Group at the Max Planck Institute for Psycholinguistics.
