= Liliane Haegeman =

Belgian professor of linguistics

Liliane Haegeman ARB
- Born: 1 July 1954 (age 72); Knokke, Belgium

Academic background
- Education: Ghent University (PhD)

Academic work
- Discipline: Linguist
- Sub-discipline: Syntax
- Institutions: University of Geneva; Charles de Gaulle University – Lille III; Ghent University

Liliane Madeleine Victor Haegeman ARB (born 1 July 1954) is a Belgian professor of linguistics at Ghent University. She received her PhD in English linguistics in 1981 from Ghent University, and has written numerous books and journal articles thereafter. Haegeman has contributed to the English generative grammar, with her book Introduction to Government and Binding Theory (1991), constituting an introduction to the Principles and Parameters approach of generative linguistics. She is also acknowledged for her contributions to syntactic cartography, including works on the left periphery of Germanic languages, negation and discourse particles, and adverbial clauses. As a native speaker of West Flemish, her research has also touched upon the comparative study of English and West Flemish in terms of the subject position and its relation to the clausal structure.

== Honors ==
Haegeman was made a member of the Royal Academy of Science, Letters and Fine Arts of Belgium (ARB) in 1982 (Dutch: 'Koninklijke Academie voor Wetenschappen, Schone Kunsten en Letteren van België'), and was also made an external member of its Flemish counterpart, the Royal Flemish Academy of Belgium for Science and the Arts (KVAB) in 1995. (Dutch: Koninklijke Vlaamse Academie van België voor Wetenschappen en Kunsten). In 2000, during her teaching period in the University of Geneva, she was made Professeur honoraire.

== Teaching ==
Haegeman held full-time teaching positions between 1984 and 2009, focusing on domains of English and general linguistics, syntactic theory, comparative syntax, historical syntax and the syntax of Germanic languages. In addition to her current position at Ghent University (2018), she has taught in University of Geneva (1984–1999) and Université Charles de Gaulle, Lille III (1999–present).

== Publications ==
=== Books ===
- Introduction to Government and Binding Theory. Blackwell, 1991.
- The Syntax of Negation. Cambridge University Press, 1995. (contributors: S. R. Anderson, J. Bresnan, B. Comrie, W. Dressler, C. J. Ewen, R. Huddleston).
- English Grammar: A Generative Perspective. Wiley, 1999. (co-authored with Jacqueline Gueron).
- Thinking Syntactically: A Guide to Argumentation and Analysis. Wiley, 2005.
- Noun Phrase in the Generative Perspective. Mouton de Gruyter, 2007. (co-authored with Artemis Alexiadou and Melita Stavrou).
- Adverbial Clauses, Main Clause Phenomena, and Composition of the Left Periphery: The Cartography of Syntactic Structures, Volume 8. OUP USA, 2012.

=== Journal articles ===
- Haegeman, L. and Van Riemsdijk, H. (1986). Verb projections raising, scope and the typology of rules affecting verbs. Linguistic Inquiry: 17 (3), 417–466.
- Haegeman, L. and Zanuttini, R. (1991). Negative heads and neg criterion. The Linguistic Review: 8 (2-4), 233–252. DOI: https://doi.org/10.1515/tlir.1991.8.2-4.233
- Haegeman, L. (2003). Conditional clauses: External and internal syntax. Mind & Language:18 (4), 317–339. DOI: https://doi.org/10.1111/1468-0017.00230
- Haegeman, L. (2006). Conditionals, factives and the left periphery. Lingua: 116 (10), 1651–1669.
- Haegeman, L. (2010) The internal syntax of adverbial clauses. Lingua: 120 (3), 628–648.
- Haegeman, L., Ángel, JF., and Andrew, R. (2013). Deconstructing the Subject Condition in terms of cumulative constraint violation. The Linguistics Review: 31(1): 73–150. DOI: https://doi.org/10.1515/tlr-2013-0022
- Eric, L. and Haegeman, L. (2016). The nanosyntax of spatial deixis. Studia Linguistica: 72 (2), 362–427.
