= M-command =

Syntactic relation

In generative grammar and related frameworks, m-command is a syntactic relation between two nodes in a syntactic tree. A node $X$ m-commands a node $Y$ if the maximal projection of $X$ dominates $Y$, but neither $X$ nor $Y$ dominates the other.

In government and binding theory, m-command was used to define the central syntactic relation of government. However, it has been largely replaced by c-command in current research. M-command is a broader relation than c-command, since a node m-commands every node that it c-commands, as well as the specifier of the phrase that it heads. Like c-command, m-command is defined over constituency-based trees and plays no role in frameworks which adopt a different notion of syntactic structure.
