= Command (teaching style) =

Traditional system of education

The Command teaching style is the closest approximation to the traditional system of education under the progressive teaching technology, Student-Directed Teaching. As part of the five distinct teaching styles developed by Don Green, Command is the most readily understood by many students, as it is most similar to what they are used to from the public system. As Green describes it,

The Command teaching style is for those students whose learning characteristics require formal instruction and a specific assignment for the practice to be appropriate for the student to master the objective. These students need to be directed as to what they will do during the class time allocated to the specific subject being studied.

== Description ==
Under the Command teaching style, the teacher will:

- Provide a unit plan consisting of the objectives for several days, written in a language that students can understand
- Provide formal instruction
- Limit formal instruction to 25% of the time
- Provide an instruction area
- Assign an appropriate amount of practice related to the instruction
- Provide a checking station with answer keys
- Use good questioning techniques and negotiation to help steer the students to becoming more independent
- Spend approximately 60% of the total class time with the students whose choice is Command
- Provide perception checks and final tests as indicated in the unit plan
- Provide a second evaluative activity, if required by an individual student

Alternatively, the student will:

- Listen to the instruction
- Do the assigned work
- Declare the mark expected on each perception check
- Do more than one perception check if the declared mark is not reached within the flexibility factor

Students who choose Command traditionally exhibit the following characteristics:

- Lack self-motivation
- Lack the ability to make good decisions about their learning
- Lack the ability to focus on a task for any extended length of time
- Lack the skills necessary to be successful in the subject being studied without teacher intervention
- Underachieve according to some external standard
- Are not risk takers
