= Ian Roberts (linguist) =

British linguist (born 1957)

Ian G. Roberts is British linguist serving as Professor of Linguistics at the University of Cambridge and a fellow of Downing College, Cambridge. He also serves on the Advisory Council of METI (Messaging Extraterrestrial Intelligence).

He received his PhD from the University of Southern California in 1985 and taught at the Universities of Geneva (1985–1993), Bangor (1991–1996) and Stuttgart (1996–2000) before taking up his present position at Cambridge in 2000. He is a fellow of Downing College.

Professor Roberts is a generative linguist and enthusiastic adopter of Chomsky's minimalist program. He has published widely in the synchronic and diachronic syntax of Romance and Germanic languages and Welsh.
