= Greenberg's linguistic universals =

Set of linguistic universals proposed by Joseph Greenberg

The American linguist Joseph Greenberg (1915–2001) proposed a set of linguistic universals based primarily on a set of 30 languages. The following list is verbatim from the list printed in the appendix of Greenberg's article "Some Universals of Grammar With Particular Reference to the Order of Meaningful Elements" in Universals of Language (1963) and "Universals Restated", sorted by context.

The numbering is fixed to keep Greenberg's number associations as these are commonly referenced by number; e.g.: "Greenberg's linguistic universal number 12".

== Typology ==
1. "In declarative sentences with nominal subject and object, the dominant order is almost always one in which the subject precedes the object."
2. "In languages with prepositions, the genitive almost always follows the governing noun, while in languages with postpositions it almost always precedes."
3. "Languages with dominant VSO order are always prepositional."
4. "With overwhelmingly greater than chance frequency, languages with normal SOV order are postpositional."
5. "If a language has dominant SOV order and the genitive follows the governing noun, then the adjective likewise follows the noun."
6. "All languages with dominant VSO order have SVO as an alternative or as the only alternative basic order."

== Syntax ==
7. "If in a language with dominant SOV order there is no alternative basic order, or only OSV as the alternative, then all adverbial modifiers of the verb likewise precede the verb. (This is the 'rigid' subtype of III.)"
8. "When a yes–no question is differentiated from the corresponding assertion by an intonational pattern, the distinctive intonational features of each of these patterns are reckoned from the end of the sentence rather than from the beginning."
9. "With well more than chance frequency, when question particles or affixes are specified in position by reference to the sentence as a whole, if initial, such elements are found in prepositional languages, and, if final, in postpositional."
10. "Question particles or affixes, when specified in position by reference to a particular word in the sentence, almost always follow that word. Such particles do not occur in languages with dominant order VSO."
11. "Inversion of statement order so that verb precedes subject occurs only in languages where the question word or phrase is normally initial. This same inversion occurs in yes–no questions only if it also occurs in interrogative word questions."
12. "If a language has dominant order VSO in declarative sentences, it always puts interrogative words or phrases first in interrogative word questions; if it has dominant order SOV in declarative sentences, there is never such an invariant rule."
13. "If the nominal object always precedes the verb, then verb forms subordinate to the main verb also precede it."
14. "In conditional statements, the conditional clause precedes the conclusion as the normal order in all languages."
15. "In expressions of volition and purpose, a subordinate verbal form always follows the main verb as the normal order except in those languages in which the nominal object always precedes the verb."
16. "In languages with dominant order VSO, an inflected auxiliary always precedes the main verb. In languages with dominant order SOV, an inflected auxiliary always follows the main verb."
17. "With overwhelmingly more than chance frequency, languages with dominant order VSO have the adjective after the noun."
18. "When the descriptive adjective precedes the noun, the demonstrative and the numeral, with overwhelmingly more than chance frequency, do likewise."
19. "When the general rule is that the descriptive adjective follows, there may be a minority of adjectives which usually precede, but when the general rule is that descriptive adjectives precede, there are no exceptions."
20. "When any or all of the items (demonstrative, numeral, and descriptive adjective) precede the noun, they are always found in that order. If they follow, the order is either the same or its exact opposite."
21. "If some or all adverbs follow the adjective they modify, then the language is one in which the qualifying adjective follows the noun and the verb precedes its nominal object as the dominant order."
22. "If in comparisons of superiority the only order, or one of the alternative orders, is standard-marker-adjective, then the language is postpositional. With overwhelmingly more than chance frequency if the only order is adjective-marker-standard, the language is prepositional."
23. "If in apposition the proper noun usually precedes the common noun, then the language is one in which the governing noun precedes its dependent genitive. With much better than chance frequency, if the common noun usually precedes the proper noun, the dependent genitive precedes its governing noun."
24. "If the relative expression precedes the noun either as the only construction or as an alternate construction, either the language is postpositional, or the adjective precedes the noun or both."
25. "If the pronominal object follows the verb, so does the nominal object."

== Morphology ==
26. "If a language has discontinuous affixes, it always has either prefixing or suffixing or both."
27. "If a language is exclusively suffixing, it is postpositional; if it is exclusively prefixing, it is prepositional."
28. "If both the derivation and inflection follow the root, or they both precede the root, the derivation is always between the root and the inflection."
29. "If a language has inflection, it always has derivation."
30. "If the verb has categories of person-number or if it has categories of gender, it always has tense-mode categories."
31. "If either the subject or object noun agrees with the verb in gender, then the adjective always agrees with the noun in gender."
32. "Whenever the verb agrees with a nominal subject or nominal object in gender, it also agrees in number."
33. "When number agreement between the noun and verb is suspended and the rule is based on order, the case is always one in which the verb precedes and the verb is in the singular."
34. "No language has a trial number unless it has a dual. No language has a dual unless it has a plural."
35. "There is no language in which the plural does not have some nonzero allomorphs, whereas there are languages in which the singular is expressed only by zero. The dual and the trial are almost never expressed only by zero."
36. "If a language has the category of gender, it always has the category of number."
37. "A language never has more gender categories in nonsingular numbers than in the singular."
38. "Where there is a case system, the only case which ever has only zero allomorphs is the one which includes among its meanings that of the subject of the intransitive verb."
39. "Where morphemes of both number and case are present and both follow or both precede the noun base, the expression of number almost always comes between the noun base and the expression of case."
40. "When the adjective follows the noun, the adjective expresses all the inflectional categories of the noun. In such cases the noun may lack overt expression of one or all of these categories."
41. "If in a language the verb follows both the nominal subject and nominal object as the dominant order, the language almost always has a case system."
42. "All languages have pronominal categories involving at least three persons and two numbers."
43. "If a language has gender categories in the noun, it has gender categories in the pronoun."
44. "If a language has gender distinctions in the first person, it always has gender distinctions in the second or third person, or in both."
45. "If there are any gender distinctions in the plural of the pronoun, there are some gender distinctions in the singular also."
