= Government (linguistics) =

Regulatory relationship between a word and its dependents

In grammar and theoretical linguistics, government or rection refers to the relationship between a word and its dependents. One can discern between at least three concepts of government: the traditional notion of case government, the highly-specialized definition of government in some generative models of syntax, and a much broader notion in dependency grammars.

== Traditional case government ==
In traditional Latin and Greek (and other) grammars, government is the control by verbs and prepositions of the selection of grammatical features of other words. Most commonly, a verb or preposition is said to "govern" a specific grammatical case if its complement must take that case in a grammatically correct structure (see: case government). For example, in Latin, most transitive verbs require their direct object to appear in the accusative case, and the dative case is reserved for indirect objects.

Thus, the phrase I see you would be rendered as Te video in Latin, using the accusative form te for the second-person pronoun, and I give a present to you would be rendered as Tibi donum do, which uses both an accusative (donum) for the direct and a dative (tibi, the dative of the second-person pronoun) for the indirect object. The phrase I help you, however, would be rendered as Tibi faveo and use only the dative form tibi. The verb favere (to help), like many others, is an exception to the default government pattern: its only object is in the dative. Although no direct object in the accusative is controlled by the specific verb, the object is traditionally considered to be indirect, mainly because passivization is unavailable except perhaps in an impersonal manner and for certain verbs of thay type. A semantic alternation may also be achieved when different case constructions are available with a verb: Id credo (id is an accusative) means I believe this, I have this opinion, and Ei credo (ei is a dative) means I trust this, I confide in this.

Prepositions, as well as postpositions and circumpositions, which are adpositions, are similar to verbs in their ability to govern the case of their complement, and like many verbs, many adpositions can govern more than one case and then have distinct interpretations. For example in Italy would be in Italia, Italia being an ablative case form, but towards Italy would be in Italiam, Italiam being an accusative case form.

== In government and binding theory ==
The abstract syntactic relation of government in government and binding theory, a phrase structure grammar, is an extension of the traditional notion of case government. Verbs govern their objects, and more generally, heads govern their dependents. A governs B if and only if:

- A is a governor (a lexical head),
- A m-commands B, and
- no barrier intervenes between A and B.

That definition is explained in more detail in the government section of the article on government and binding theory.

== Government broadly construed ==
One sometimes encounters definitions of government that are much broader than the one just produced. Government is understood as the property that regulates which words can or must appear with the referenced word. This broader understanding of government is part of many dependency grammars. The notion is that many individual words in a given sentence can appear only by virtue of the fact that some other word appears in that sentence.

According to that definition, government occurs between any two words connected by a dependency, the dominant word opening slots for subordinate words. The dominant word is the governor, and the subordinates are its governees. The following dependency tree illustrates governors and governees:

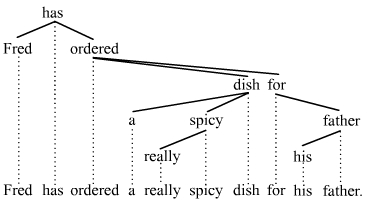

The word has governs Fred and ordered; in other words, has is governor over its governees Fred and ordered. Similarly, ordered governs dish and for, that is, ordered is governor over its governees dish and for; etc. This understanding of government is widespread among dependency grammars.

== Governors vs. heads ==
The distinction between the terms governor and head is a source of confusion because of the definitions of government produced above. Indeed, governor and head are overlapping concepts. The governor and the head of a given word are often the same other word. The understanding of those concepts becomes difficult, however, when discontinuities are involved. The following example of a w-fronting discontinuity from German illustrates the difficulty:

Wem denkst du haben sie geholfen?
who-DAT think you have they helped?
'Who do you think they helped?'

Two of the criteria mentioned above for identifying governors (and governees) are applicable to the interrogative pronoun wem 'whom'. The pronoun receives dative case from the verb geholfen 'helped' (= case government) and it can appear by virtue of the fact that geholfen appears (= licensing). Those observations allow a strong argument to be made that geholfen is the governor of wem though both words are separated from each other by the rest of the sentence. In such constellations, one sometimes distinguishes between head and governor.

While the governor of wem is geholfen, the head of wem is taken to be the finite verb, denkst 'think'. In other words, when a discontinuity occurs, it is assumed that the governor and the head (of the relevant word) are distinct, or they are the same word. Exactly how the terms head and governor are used can depend on the particular theory of syntax that is employed.

== See also ==
- Agreement (linguistics)
- C-command
- Case government
- Collocation
- Dependency grammar
- M-command
- Phrase structure grammar

== Links ==
- Verb government in German
