= Student-directed teaching =

Teaching method aiming to give the student greater control

Student-directed teaching is a teaching technology that aims to give the student greater control, ownership, and accountability over their own education. Developed to counter institutionalized, mass, schooling, student-directed teaching allows students to make their own choices while they learn in order to make education much more meaningful, relevant, and effective.

Student-directed teaching is a product of research done by Don and Anne Green, who work in the Canadian education system. Their research, done for the University of Calgary, developed the foundational philosophy for student-directed teaching. Student-directed teaching evolves the pedagogical practices set forth by technologies such as the Montessori method.

== Problem with mass schooling ==
The larger aim of student-directed teaching is to revolutionize education. Nascent in the progressive philosophy is a feeling that education has remained unchanged for far too long: since its inception, in fact, a century and a half ago. The global climate today differs vastly from that of 1850. The largest change in the last century has been the acceleration of the proliferation of information. The 20th century has seen several advances in technology, including the invention of the transistor, the radio, the television, and the Internet. Each of these inventions has accelerated the commonly understood notion of culture. And with each progressive acceleration, the strain on individuals, not just students, to make sense of the world increases. Although it affects everyone, it is most noticeable in children: ultimately, the institution of mass schooling has been unable to keep up with the changes dictated by the intense proliferation of knowledge. Students, thus is the claim of Student-Directed Teaching, are failed by the system, leaving them bored, apathetic and mundane.

The first law pertaining to compulsory education was passed in 1642 by the Massachusetts Bay Colony. Even then, it was evident that schooling had a "hidden" agenda: to ensure that "youth readily accept the developing religious, political and social patterns and become good citizens of the state and of the newly established church" (Kotin & Aikman, qtd in Grant 166). By 1648, the state had "assumed a clear responsibility for the education and training of all children" (ibid). At this point, however, compulsory schooling was not in place.

In 1787, the United States Constitution was signed with nary a mention of public education, suggesting that the Founding Fathers of the United States would not have approved of state intervention in their children's schooling. Support for public schooling rose throughout the end of the 18th century and beginning of the 19th century, and by 1852, Massachusetts had passed the first general compulsory attendance law in the United States.

The compulsory schooling movement in the 1850s was led by Horace Mann and by Sears and Harper of the University of Chicago and by Thorndyke of Columbia Teachers College. These men were industrialists and proponents of the newly emerged wealth created by the Industrial Revolution. Their views on public schooling mirrored their economic philosophies. Because of the newfound freedom and wealth promoted in the United States, the middle of the 19th century was a period of great immigration:

[Horace Mann] lived at a time of tremendous social change when immigrants were pouring into the Northeastern states, farmers were leaving rural areas to work in factories, and cities were growing rapidly with crime and poverty on the rise... Mann and other reformers were alarmed by the upheaval, and promoted state regulated public education as a way to bring order and discipline to the working class in this rapidly changing society. Threatened by the growing population of urban poor, Mann and his fellow reformers placed a major emphasis on "moral training," standardization and classroom drill.

Mann and company were all products of the Industrial Revolution. They saw the burgeoning population as little more than factory workers to be trained to work on the line. While the Industrial Revolution did indeed speed up many production cycles, it also created a vacuum within the warehouses, which necessarily had to be filled by trained human activity: the machines still needed people behind them to direct the work. As such, "schools are intended to produce, through the application of formulas, formulaic human beings whose behavior can be predicted and controlled."

The basis for modern mass schooling was conceived in the 1850s and has remained virtually unchanged since then. In the 1850s, Mann and his fellow reformers began the standardization and systematization of public education: "(a) All children received the same social and political ideology, (b) schools were an instrument of public policy that aimed at fixing society's problems, and (c) state agencies were created to control local schools." Thus, it becomes evident, all the more strikingly so a century and a half later, that compulsory schooling was not aimed at distributing knowledge.

Why, then, was compulsory schooling created?

Howley et al. (1995) in their important critique of American schools and gifted education, echo J.S. Mill (1859/1978) in their claim that "schooling aims, as it has for a very long time, to inculcate just those habits, attitudes, and skills that legitimate it in the eyes of powerful economic interests" (p. 6). Spring (1974) agrees: "Schooling means... shaping the total character of the individual to meet the political and economic demands of the state" (p. 139). Gatto (1993) argues that compulsory schooling was not instituted in order to make people more literate, thoughtful, knowledgeable, or intellectually skillful, but to make them more manageable. Curti (1959) sees the history of American education as the history of conflict between those who want to use education to maintain power and those who want to use it to improve life for everyone. Reitman (1992) also sees American education as the result of struggle between incompatible goals: promoting democracy, supporting economic competitiveness, and teaching moral values.

Mass schooling was devised to be ''one general, and uniform system of education, which will render the mass of the people more homogeneous and thereby fit them more easily for uniform and peaceable government" (Rush, qtd in Grant 169). The creation of pliable people erased, then, the acute morality of the populace, replacing it instead with mindless automation. Mass schooling teaches people how to do what they are told when they are told to do so.

The problem that appears with using compulsory schooling is that the massive education system cannot account for differences between its subjects, from different learning preferences to different teaching styles to different paces. Student-Directed Teaching asks, "why do students all have to do the same thing, at the same time, in the same manner?" It is because of this, according to the Student-Directed Teaching philosophy, that students lose faith in school: gifted students are not challenged enough while students that fall behind have little support. The public education system rewards those who remain in the middle: these are the students who receive praise because they never challenge the teacher, give textbook answers on homework and spit back cute phrases the teacher said yesterday. These are students who understand that challenging the status quo and being different carries a penalty.

== Teaching styles ==
Student-directed teaching is when the student takes ownership over his or her own work. At its core, it is based around the five teaching styles developed by Don Green (B.Ed., Dip. Ed.). In his book Teaching in Style, published in 1998, he outlines five different teaching styles that fit on a spectrum. The student then chooses the teaching style he or she prefers.

The five styles are as follows: Command, Task, Peer-Partner, Student-Teacher Contract, and Self-Directed.

=== Command ===
In this style, the teacher teaches the objectives step by step and outlines the practice to be completed. This style consists of formal instruction and guided practice with the student being directed as to what they will do during the class time allocated to the subject being studied. This mode of instruction most closely resembles what is available in the public system.

=== Task ===
This is similar to Command, except that the student is now given some choice in the practice necessary to master the objectives. In Task, the student will demonstrate his/her ability to select the amount, kind and complexity of the practice to be done to complete the objectives.

=== Peer-Partner ===
In this style, students form partnerships with one other student and work together on the objectives. They receive no formal instruction unless they ask for it, and may decide to listen to some or all of the formal lesson or to work on the objectives without any teacher help. Students who choose this style must be able to teach each other, to engage in discussion, and then come to a consensus, to stay focused and to make good decisions about the practice necessary to master the objectives.

=== Student-teacher contract ===
This style is especially suited for students who want to work by themselves but who need some structure to keep them focused. The student completes a written contract outlining the objective, how they are going to master the objective and how long it will take them. The contract must be agreed upon with the teacher and signed by both the student and teacher prior to the student beginning the work.

=== Self-directed ===
This style is selected by students who make independent decisions, have a good understanding of how they learn and who are self-motivated. These students are beginning to individualize their learning and to compact the curriculum. They usually complete the unit several periods before the Command and Task students which results in their having Earned Time. This is time available to a student who has selected Peer-Partner, Student-Teacher Contract or Self-Directed teaching style and who has completed the objectives of a unit in less time than allocated for the unit. In Earned Time, a student can work in an area of high interest, demonstrating high-level thinking and new learning. The choice is not not to work, but rather to take part in a passion area directly related to the student's ability and interest. The passion area need not be related to the subject in which the student earned the time.

== Community of learners ==
Other than the teaching styles, what sets student-directed teaching apart from other teaching methods is the community of learners. Outlined by Anne Green in her book Let Them Show Us the Way: fostering independent learning in the elementary classroom, the community of learners transforms the classroom into an experiential educational space.

The idea behind the Community of Learners is premised on the notion that "in [this] environment children take charge of their learning, as their strengths and gifts rise to their potential."

The Community of Learners is a way of arranging the classroom in which learning is actively experienced rather than passively absorbed. The children are free to move around the classroom, interacting with their peers, teacher and available resources equally and indiscriminately. This type of room configuration is meaning full for classroom discussions. This allows not only for students to gain from interaction but also interaction from the teacher. The student teacher relationship many times is based on authority. In this room figuration the teacher is seen as more interactive with the students. They are more opportunities for teacher to mentor and guide discussion and classroom instruction. This allows for the students to see the teacher as an educational model. This more friendly atmosphere will allow all students to participate in classroom discussion. The community is created in equal parts between the student and the teacher, erasing traditional hierarchies. Anne Green arranges her Community of Learners in the following manner:

...children's desks, or home base (as they call it), are arranged in a circle, leaving a wonderful free area in the centre of impromptu mime, plays, dance, and groups gathering to hear a story, song, or poem woven into the learning... the outer edge of the classroom accommodates painting, music, books, manipulatives, children's projects, and small groups of students, parents and the teacher, all of whom can slip in and out of the center to mediate or join the ongoing learning."

The community must not be confused with an area of anarchy. The students have complete mobility and freedom to demonstrate their understanding and ability, but there are certain rules:

- Refrain from stepping on anyone else's words. Teachers and parents, in particular, must be aware that as children interact socially, adding their story versions and asking questions, the narrative invariably improves. Often what adults think of as interruptions actually give wings to the stories.
- Build onto one another's ideas and accept all ideas as a part of the thinking that is responsible for webbing the rich and welcome everyday knowledge with the school knowledge, and vice versa.
- Use space wisely
- Stay on task.
- Share as needed with a peer or an adult in the room after asking politely if that person can spare a minute.
- Assemble at home base to share works-in-progress. Everyone is welcome to continue writing; however, out of respect for those wishing to share, side conversation is not welcome.
- Give whole class attention when there is a teacher lesson or a guest speaker.
- Give whole class attention when a peer is celebrating his published work.
- Understand that when asked to focus as a whole class there will be strategies, skills, stories read, or information shared in context with the ongoing learning. (This is a time when the teacher takes advantage of the "teachable moments.")
- Take advantage of the one-to-one mini-lessons. During these lessons, it is important to practice listening, wondering, and questioning with the student. This can be a time of growth and self-discovery, and often a student just needs encouragement to use his own ideas to solve a problem.

In a community of learners, the children's interests create, for them and the community, "a mushrooming of learning for learning's sake."

== Differences with other progressive teaching methods ==
Student-directed teaching is not the only alternative teaching method in existence. Following are some key differences between student-directed teaching and other popular alternative ideologies.

=== Montessori ===
The Montessori method is a progressive teaching technology that, like student-directed teaching, places the child at the centre of the educational ecology. While Montessori does allow for the child's learning experience to be adapted to his or her own capabilities, it still retains some vestiges of the mainstream education philosophy in its apprehension over giving the child complete freedom and ownership. Student-Directed Teaching is distinguished from Montessori in the availability of the five teaching styles and the Community of Learners.

=== Waldorf ===
The Waldorf method of education is based on Rudolf Steiner's concept of anthroposophy, where learning is interdisciplinary, integrates practical, artistic and conceptual elements, and is coordinated with the rhythms of life. Similar to student-directed teaching, the Waldorf method is hesitant in recognizing hard boundaries between subjects, passion areas and experiential learning; additionally, the Waldorf method places heavy emphasis on imagination, much like student-directed teaching.

Where student-directed teaching differs is in its progressive approach to student accountability. The Waldorf method, despite its efforts to improve education holistically differs in that there is still a set program to follow, flexible as it may be. Student-directed teaching is much more of a results-driven education system, where the choice is never not to work, but how to work; as long as the work required by the curriculum is being completed, each student is completely free to go about it his or her own way.

== Criticism: Not student-directed teaching but student-directed learning ==
Traditional education focuses on teaching, not learning. However, most of what one learns before, during, and after attending schools is learned without it being taught to us. A child learns such fundamental things as how to walk without being taught. Adults learn most of what they use at work or at leisure while at work or leisure. Most of what is taught in classroom settings is forgotten, and much or what is remembered is irrelevant.
