= Richard S. Kayne =

American linguist

Richard Kayne
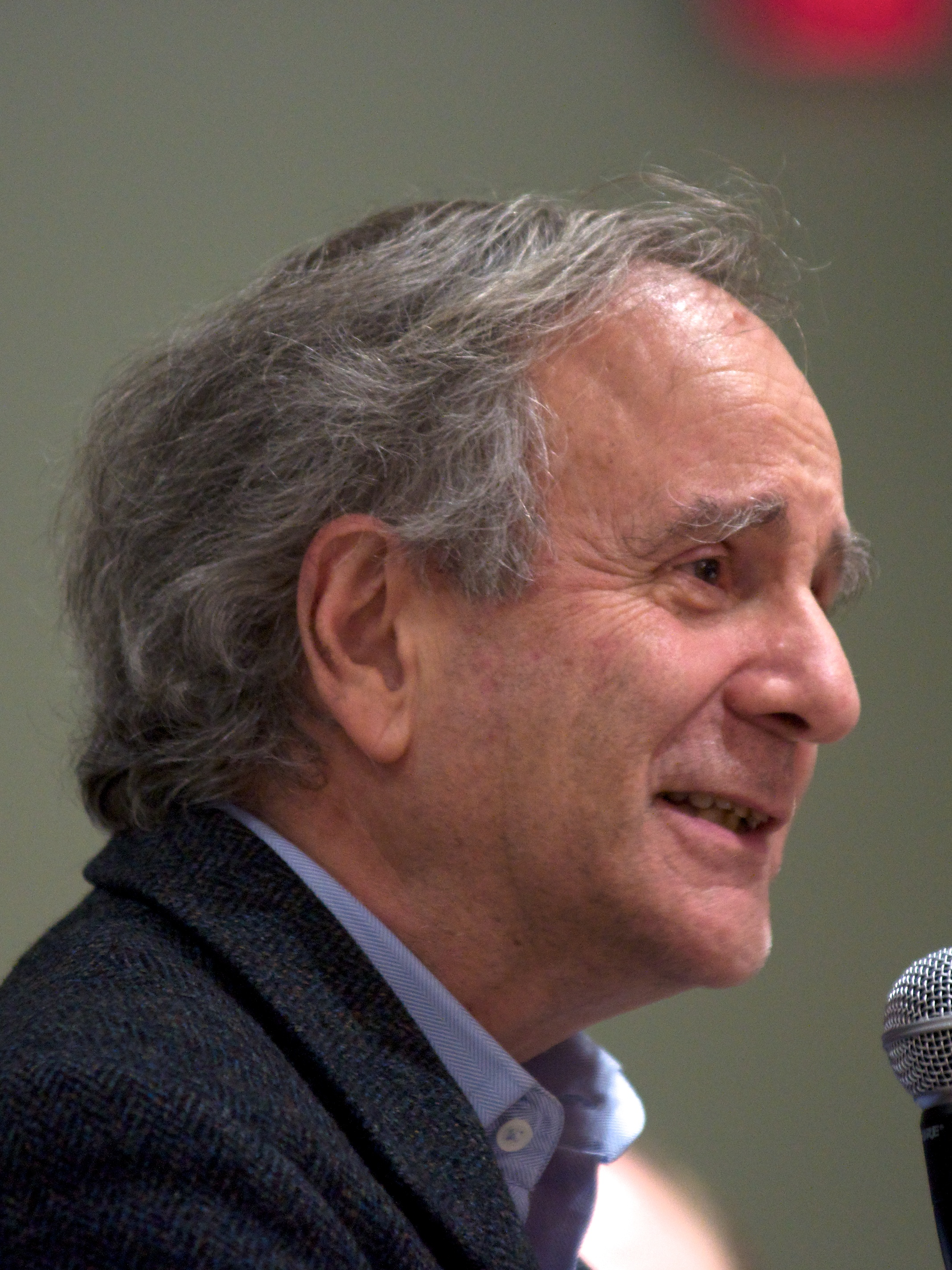
- Born: 1944 (age 80–81)
- Education: Columbia University (BA); Massachusetts Institute of Technology (PhD)
- Known for: Antisymmetry
- Scientific career
- Fields: Linguistics
- Institutions: New York University; City University of New York; University of Paris VIII
- Doctoral advisor: John R. Ross

Richard Stanley Kayne (born 1944) is an American linguist and professor at New York University.

== Life and career ==
Kayne was born in 1944. After receiving a B.A. in mathematics from Columbia University in 1964, he studied linguistics at the Massachusetts Institute of Technology, receiving his Ph.D. in 1969. He then taught at the University of Paris VIII (1969–1986), MIT (1986–1988) and the City University of New York (1988–1997), becoming Professor at New York University in 1997.

He has made prominent contributions to the study of the syntax of English and the Romance languages, such as French or Italian, within the framework of transformational grammar. His theory of Antisymmetry has become part of the canon of the Minimalist syntax literature.

== Publications ==
- Movement and Silence, Oxford University Press, New York, 2005
- (with Thomas Leu & Raffaella Zanuttini) Lasting Insights and Questions: An Annotated Syntax Reader, Wiley/Blackwell, Malde, Mass., 2014
- Kayne, Richard S. (1994). The Antisymmetry of Syntax (Linguistic Inquiry Monograph 25). MIT Press.
