= C-command =

Concept in generative grammar

In generative grammar and related frameworks, a node in a parse tree c-commands its sister node and all of its sister's descendants. In these frameworks, c-command plays a central role in defining and constraining operations such as syntactic movement, binding, and scope. Tanya Reinhart introduced c-command in 1976 as a key component of her theory of anaphora. The term is short for "constituent command".

== Definition and examples ==
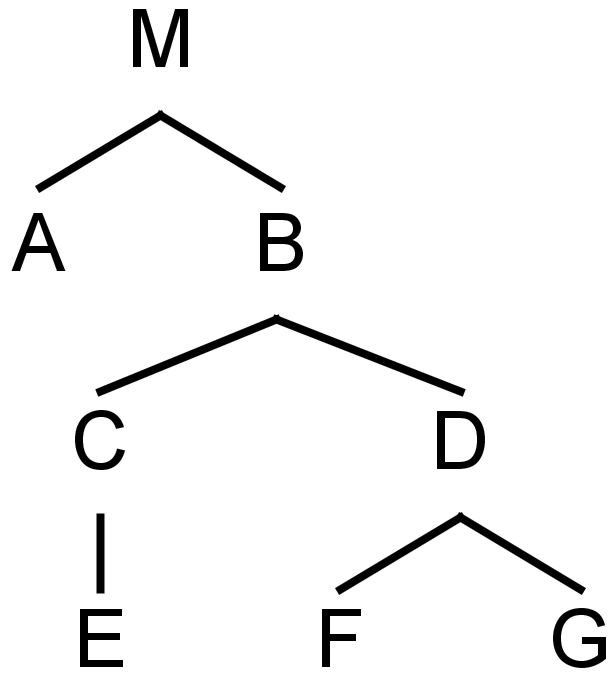
Tree 1 (use to evaluate standard definition of c-command)

=== Standard Definition ===
Common terms to represent the relationships between nodes are below (refer to the tree on the right):

- M is a parent or mother to A and B.
- A and B are children or daughters of M.
- A and B are sisters or siblings.
- M is a grandparent or grandmother to C and D.

The standard definition of c-command is based partly on the relationship of dominance: Node N_{1} dominates node N_{2} if N_{1} is above N_{2} in the tree and one can trace a path from N_{1} to N_{2} moving only downwards in the tree (never upwards); that is, if N_{1} is a parent, grandparent, etc. of N_{2}. For a node (N_{1}) to c-command another node (N_{2}) the parent of N_{1} must establish dominance over N_{2}.

Based upon this definition of dominance, node N_{1} c-commands node N_{2} if and only if:

- Node N_{1} does not dominate N_{2},
- N_{2} does not dominate N_{1}, and
- The first (i.e. lowest) branching node that dominates N_{1} also dominates N_{2}.

For example, according to the standard definition, in the tree at the right,

- M does not c-command any node because it dominates all other nodes.
- A c-commands B, C, D, E, F, and G.
- B c-commands A.
- C c-commands D, F, and G.
- D c-commands C and E.
- E does not c-command any node because it does not have a sister node or any daughter nodes.
- F c-commands G.
- G c-commands F.

If node A c-commands node B, and B also c-commands A, it can be said that A symmetrically c-commands B. If A c-commands B but B does not c-command A, then A asymmetrically c-commands B. The notion of asymmetric c-command plays a major role in Richard S. Kayne's theory of Antisymmetry.

== Where c-command is used ==
Syntax tree for example sentence (1) using the standard definition

=== Standard Definition ===
A simplification of the standard definition on c-command is as follows:

A node A c-commands a node B iff

- Neither A nor B dominates the other, and
- Every branching node dominating A also dominates B

As such, we get sentences like:

(1) [John] likes [her]

Where [node A] John c-commands [node B]. This means that [node A] also c-commands [node C] and [node D], which means that John c-commands both [likes] and [her].

Tree example for sentence (3). This example shows that co-reference is not possible in definite anaphora and that DP He c-commands DP John but they are non-coreferential as denoted by the different subscripts.

=== Syntax Tree ===
In a parse tree (or syntax tree), nodes A and B are replaced with a DP constituent, where the DP [John] c-commands DP [he]. In a more complex sentence, such as (2), the pronoun could interact with its antecedent and be interpreted in two ways.

(2) [John]_{i} thinks that [he]_{i/m} is smart

In this example, two interpretations could be made:

(i) John thinks that he is smart
(ii) John thinks that someone else is smart

In the first interpretation, [John] c-commands [he] and also co-references [he]. Co-reference is noted by the same subscript (i) present under both of the DP nodes. The second interpretation shows that [John] c-commands [he] but does not co-reference the DP [he]. Since co-reference is not possible, there are different subscripts under the DP [John] _{(i)} and the DP [he] _{(m)}.

Tree example for sentence (2) using constituent nodes. This example follows the first interpretation that John thinks that he is smart, with the two DPs showing c-command, as well as co-reference as denoted by the same subscripts.

=== Definite Anaphora ===
Example sentences like these shows the basic relationship of pronouns with its antecedent expression. However, looking at definite anaphora where pronouns takes a definite descriptions as its antecedent, we see that pronouns with name cannot co-refer with its antecedent within its domain.

(3) He_{i} thinks that John_{i*} is smart

Where [he] c-commands [John] but [he]_{i} cannot co-refer to [John]_{i*}, and we can only interpret that someone else thinks that John is smart.

In response of the limits of c-command, Reinhart proposes a constraint on definite anaphora:

A given pronoun [DP e.g., he in (3)] must be interpreted as non-coreferential with any distinct non-pronouns [e.g. John] in its c-command domain

=== Binding Theory ===
The notion of c-command can be found in frameworks such as Binding Theory, which shows the syntactic relationship between pronouns and its antecedent. The binding theory framework was first introduced by Chomsky in 1973 in relation to the treatment of various anaphoric phenomena, and has since been revised throughout the years. Chomsky's analysis places a constraint on the relationship between a pronoun and a variable antecedent. As such, a variable cannot be the antecedent of a pronoun to its left.

The first major revision to binding theory is found in Chomsky (1980) with their standard definitions:

a. An anaphor α is bound in β if there is a category c-commanding it and coindexed with it in β
b. Otherwise, α is free in β

=== Quantificational Binding ===
Compared to definite anaphora, quantificational expressions works differently and is more restrictive. As proposed by Reinhart in 1973, a quantificational expression must c-command any pronoun that it binds.

(3) [Every man] thinks that [he] is intelligent.

a. ∀x(man(x)): x thinks x is intelligent. (bound)
b. ∀x(man(x)): x thinks y is intelligent. (coreferential or 'free')

In this example, the quantifier [every man] c-commands the other pronoun [he] and a bound variable reading is possible as the pronoun 'he' is bound by the universal quantifier 'every man'. The sentence in (3) show two possible readings as a result of the bounding of pronouns with the universal quantifier. The reading in (3a) states that for all man, they each think that they (he) are intelligent. Meanwhile, sentence (3b) state that for all men, they all think that someone (he) is intelligent. In general, for a pronoun to be bound by the quantifier and bound variable reading made possible, (i) the quantifier must c-command the pronoun and (ii) both the quantifier and pronoun have to occur in the same sentence.

== History ==
Relative to the history of the concept of c-command, one can identify two stages: (i) analyses focused on applying c-command to solve specific problems relating to coreference and non-coreference; (ii) analyses which focused on c-command as a structural on a wide range of natural language phenomena that include but are not limited to tracking coreference and non-coreference.

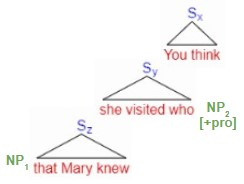
Any rule that maintains a rightward movement of NP_{1} (especially when crossing to the right of NP_{2}), would counteract the idea of coreference despite being marked as +coref. Rules that maintain a leftward movement will keep supporting coreferencing.

=== Stage 1: Coreference ===
The development of ‘c-command’ is introduced by the notion of coreference. This is denoted by the first stage of the concept of c-command. In the initial emergence of coreference, Jackendoff (1972). officially states... If for any NP_{1} and NP_{2} in a sentence, there is no entry in the table NP_{2} + coref NP_{2}, enter in the table NP_{1} - coref NP_{2} (OBLIGATORY)

In other words, this rule states that any noun phrases that have not been associated with a coreference rule, are assumed to be noncoreferential. The tree to the right specifies this through the cyclical leftward movement of the pronoun and/or noun.

This is, then, edited by Lasnik (1976) in which...

NP_{1} cannot be interpreted as coreferential with NP_{2} iff NP_{1} precedes and commands NP_{2} and NP_{2} is not a pronoun. If NP_{1} precedes and commands NP_{2}, and NP_{2} is not a pronoun, then NP_{1} and NP_{1} are noncoreferential.

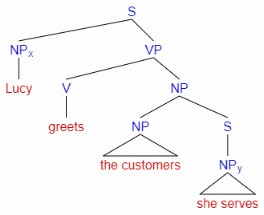
If in the sentence, NP_{y} isn't a pronoun, Lasnik's rule states it as ungrammatical even if NP_{x} is or isn't a pronoun.

According to this rule, it is essential that NP_{2} (denoted as NP_{y} in the tree on the left) be a pronoun for the sentence to be grammatical, despite NP_{1} (denoted as NP_{x} on the tree) being a pronoun or not. This can be shown through the examples below.

a) Lucy greets the customers she serves.

b) *She greets the customers Lucy serves.

c) *Lucy greets the customers Lucy serves.

d) She greets the customers she serves.

In this edition of coreference, Lasnik sets some restrictions on the permissible locations of NP_{1} and NP_{2}, which hint at potential dominance.

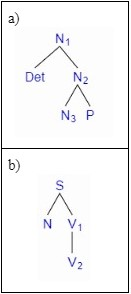
a) N_{3} m-commands Det but doesn't c-command it; b) V_{1} c-commands N but doesn't m-command it

=== Stage Two: Dominance ===
This leads to Stage 2 of the concept of c-command in which particular dominance is thoroughly explored. The term c-command was introduced by Tanya Reinhart in her 1976 dissertation and is a shortened form of constituent command. Reinhart thanks Nick Clements for suggesting both the term and its abbreviation. Reinhart (1976) states that...

A commands node B iff the branching node ⍺_{1} most immediately dominating A either dominates B or is immediately dominated by a node ⍺_{2} which dominates B, and ⍺_{2} is of the same category type as ⍺_{1}

In other words, “⍺ c-commands β iff every branching node dominating ⍺ dominates β”

Chomsky adds a second layer to the previous edition of the c-command rule by introducing the requirement of maximal projections. He states...

⍺ c-commands β iff every maximal projection dominating ⍺ dominates β

This became known as "m-command."

The tree to the right compares the two definitions in this stage. Reinhart's "c-command" focuses on the branching nodes whereas Chomsky's "m-command" focuses on the maximal projections.

The current and widely used definition of c-command that Reinhart had developed was not new to syntax. Similar configurational notions had been circulating for more than a decade. In 1964, Klima defined a configurational relationship between nodes he labeled "in construction with". In addition, Langacker proposed a similar notion of "command" in 1969. Reinhart's definition has also shown close relations to Chomsky's 'superiority relation.'

== Criticism and Alternatives ==
Over the years, the validity and importance of c-command for the theory of syntax have been widely debated. Linguists such as Benjamin Bruening have provided empirical data to prove that c-command is flawed and fails to predict whether or not pronouns are being used properly.

=== Bruening's take on c-command ===
In most cases, c-command correlates with precedence (linear order); that is, if node A c-commands node B, it is usually the case that node A also precedes node B. Furthermore, basic S(V)O (subject-verb-object) word order in English correlates positively with a hierarchy of syntactic functions, subjects precede (and c-command) objects. Moreover, subjects typically precede objects in declarative sentences in English and related languages. Going back to Bruening (2014), an argument is presented which suggests that theories of the syntax that build on c-command have misconstrued the importance of precedence and/or the hierarchy of grammatical functions (i.e. the grammatical function of subject versus object). The grammatical rules of pronouns and the variable binding of pronouns that co-occur with quantified noun phrases and wh-phrases were originally grouped together and interpreted as being the same, but Bruening brings to light that there is a notable difference between the two and provides his own theory on this matter. Bruening suggests that the current function of c-command is inaccurate and concludes that what c-command is intended to address is more accurately analyzed in terms of precedence and grammatical functions. Furthermore, the c-command concept was developed primarily on the basis of syntactic phenomena of English, a language with relatively strict word order. When confronted with the much freer word order of many other languages, the insights provided by c-command are less compelling since linear order becomes less important.

As previously suggested, the phenomena that c-command is intended to address may be more plausibly examined in terms of linear order and a hierarchy of syntactic functions. Concerning the latter, some theories of syntax take a hierarchy of syntactic functions to be primitive. This is true of Head-Driven Phrase Structure Grammar (HPSG), Lexical Functional Grammar (LFG), and dependency grammars (DGs). The hierarchy of syntactic functions that these frameworks posit is usually something like the following: SUBJECT > FIRST OBJECT > SECOND OBJECT > OBLIQUE OBJECT. Numerous mechanisms of syntax are then addressed in terms of this hierarchy

=== Barker's input on c-command ===
Like Bruening, Barker (2012) provides his own input on c-command, stating that it is not relevant for quantificational binding in English. Although not a complete characterization of the conditions in which a quantifier can bind a pronoun, Barker proposes a scope requirement.

Barker's Scope Requirement: a quantifier must take scope over any pronoun that it binds

As such, a quantifier can take scope over a pronoun only if it can take scope over an existential inserted in the place of the pronoun

(4) [Each woman ]_{i} denied that [she]_{i} met the shah

(5) [Each woman ]_{i} denied that [someone]_{i} met the shah

The sentence in (5) indicates that [each woman] scopes over [someone] and this supports the claim that [each woman] can take scope over a pronoun such as in (4).

(6) The man who traveled with [each woman ]_{i} denied that [she]_{j} met the shah

(7) The man who traveled with [each woman ]_{i} denied that [someone]_{i} met the shah*

The sentence in (7) indicates that [each woman] cannot scope over [someone] and shows that the quantifier does not take scope over the pronoun. As such, there is no interpretation where each woman in a sentence (6) refers to she and coreference is not possible, which is indicated with a different subscript for she.

Bruening along with other linguists such as Chung-Chien Shan and Chris Barker has gone against Reinhart's claims by suggesting that variable binding and co-reference do not relate to each other. Barker (2012) aims to demonstrate how variable binding can function through the usage of continuations without c-command. This is achieved by avoiding the usage of c-command and instead focusing on the notion of precedence in order to present a system that is capable of binding variables and accounting events such as crossover violation. Barker shows that precedence, in the way of an evaluation order, can be used in the place of c-command.

=== Wuijts' response to Barker's work ===
Another important work of criticism stems from Wuijts (2016) which is a response to Barker's stance on c-command and poses the question for Barker's work: How are “alternatives to c-command for the binding of pronouns justified and are these alternatives adequate?”. Wuijts dives deep into Barker's work and concludes that the semantic interpretation of pronouns serves as functions in their own context.

Wuijts further claims that a binder can adopt the outcome as an argument and bind the pronoun all through a system that utilizes continuation without the notion of c-command. Both Bruening's and Barker's alternatives to c-command for the binding of pronouns are determined as ‘adequate alternatives’ which accurately show how co-reference and variable binding can operate without c-command. Wuijts brings forth two primary points that justify using a form of precedence:

(1) Precedence is useful as it can be used to explain asymmetry which can not be explained through c-command

(2) The natural utterance and construction of sentences justify using a form of precedence.

Both Barker and Wuijts state that the goal is not to eliminate c-command entirely but to recognize that there are better alternatives that exist. In other words, c-command can still be used to effectively differentiate between strong and weak crossovers but it may not be as successful in other areas such as asymmetry which was previously mentioned. Wuijts concludes that a better alternative without c-command may be preferred and suggests that the current alternatives to c-command point to precedence, the binary relation between nodes in a tree structure, to be of great importance.

=== Cho's investigation of Chomsky's binding theory ===
Keek Cho investigates Chomsky's binding theory and proposes that lexical items in the same argument structures that stem from the same predicates, require an m-command-based binding relation whereas lexical items in arguments structures that stem from different predicates require c-command based binding relations.

Cho (2019) challenges Chomsky’s binding theory (1995) by showing that its definition of c-command in binding principles B and C, fails to work in different argument structures of different predicates. Cho states that binding principles use m-command-based c-command for intra-argument structures and binding principles use command-based c-command for inter argument structure. With this statement, Cho implies that the notion of c-command used in binding principles is actually m-command and both c-command and m-command have their own limitations.

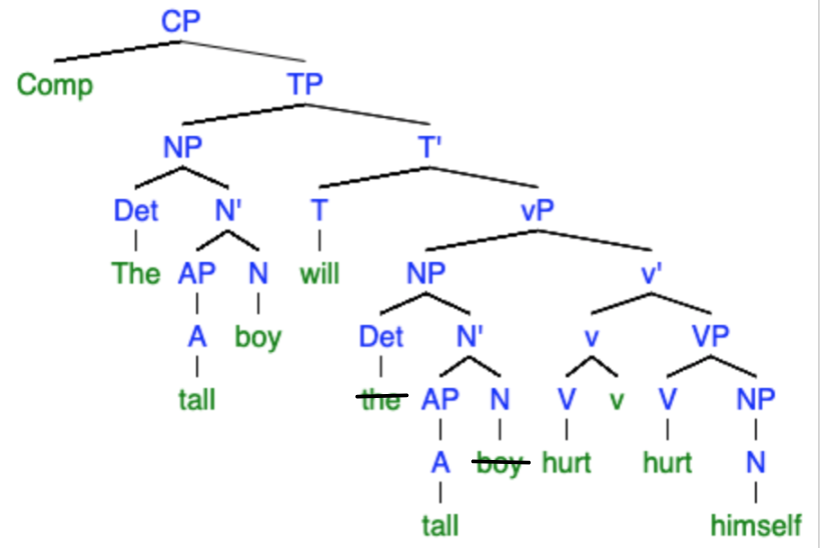
A syntactic tree structure that illustrates sentence (1a) which satisfies binding principle A.

Looking at Binding Relations in Intra-Argument Structures

By analyzing the following sentences, Cho is able to support the argument that the notion of c-command used in binding principles is actually m-command:

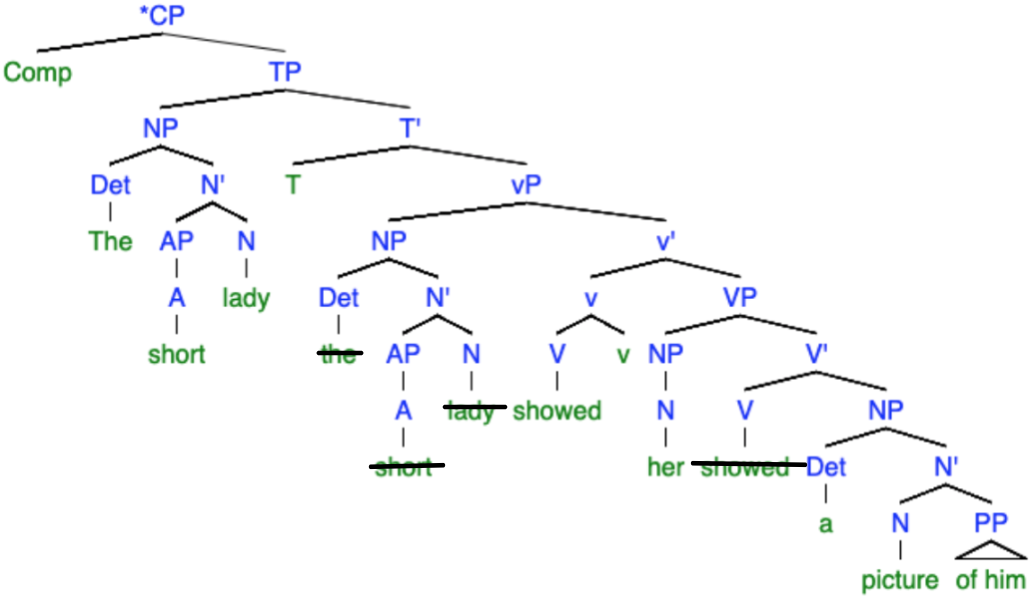
A syntactic tree structure that illustrates sentence (1b) is ill-formed. The pronoun 'her' is bound in its governing category which violates binding principle B. Cho (2019) argues that the notion of c-command being used is actually m-command.

(1a) The tall boy_{i} will hurt himself_{i}

(1b)*The short lady_{i} showed her_{i} a picture of him

(1c)*The matronly woman_{i} believes that we hate Jina_{i}

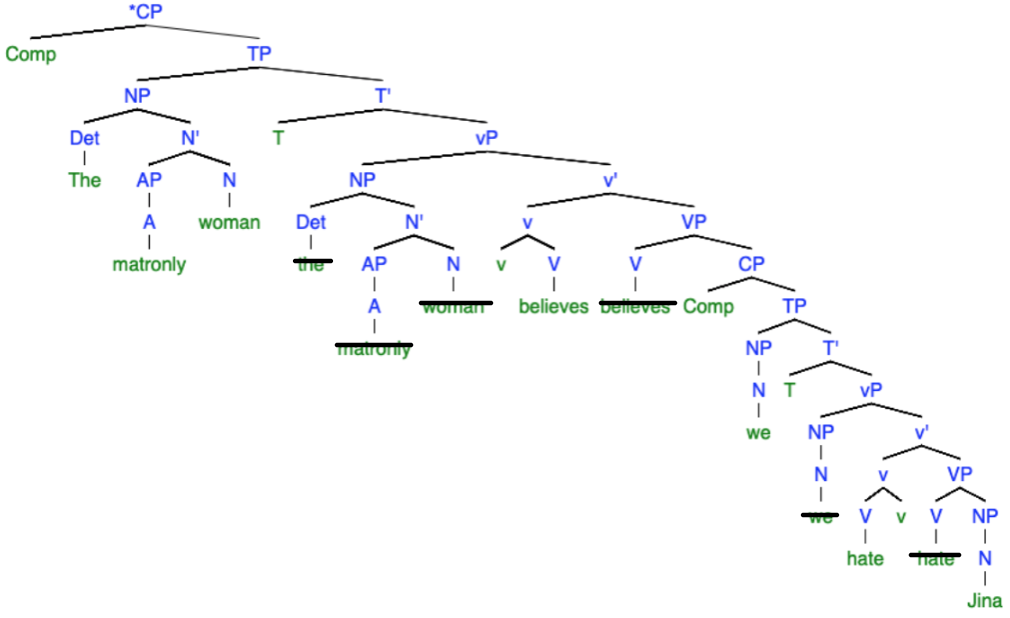
A syntactic structure that illustrates sentence (1c) is ill-formed. Sentence (1c) violates binding principle C and Cho (2019) argues that this uses the notion of m-command.

By analyzing sentence (1a), it is apparent that the governing category for himself, the anaphor, is the entire sentence The tall boy will hurt himself. The antecedent, boy, c-commands himself. This is done in a way that allows for the categorial maximal projection of the former to c-command the categorial maximal projection of the latter. Cho argues that the notion of c-command in sentences (1a), (1b), and (1c) are in fact m-command and that the m-command-based binding principles deal with binding relations of lexical items and/or arguments that are in the same argument structure of a predicate.

In sentence (1a), boy and himself are lexical items that serve as external and internal arguments of hurt, a two-place predicate. The two lexical items boy and himself are also in the same argument structure of the same predicate.

In sentence (1b), lady and her are lexical items that serve as external and internal arguments for showed, a three-place predicate. The two lexical items lady and her are also in the same argument structure of the same predicate.

In sentence (1c), beliefs is a two-place main clause predicate and takes on woman, the subject, as its external argument and that we hate Jina, the embedded clause, as its internal argument.

Looking at Binding Relations in Inter-Argument Structures

Cho argues that binding relations in the intra-argument structures utilize m-command-based c-command which is limited to the binding relations of arguments and/or lexical items belonging to argument structures of the same predicate. Cho makes use of the following sentences to demonstrate how command-based c-command operates for inter-argument structure binding relations:

(2a) The blond girl fainted when she heard the news

(2b) She fainted when the blonde girl heard the news

(2c) He has arrived and John will visit you

(2d) John has arrived and he will visit you

(2e) *John thinks she is good, and Tom thinks Mary is not good

(2f) *He sat down after John entered the room

(2g) After he entered the room, John sat down

Cho not only uses sentences (2a)-(2g) to explain command-based c-command and its role in inter-argument structure binding relations but also claims that command-based c-command can account for unexplained binding relations between different argument structures joined by a conjunctive phrase as well as explain why sentence (7d) is grammatical and (7e) is ungrammatical.

== Implications ==
=== Memory ===
The notion of c-command shows the relation of pronouns with its antecedent expression. In general, pronouns, such as it, are used to refer to previous concepts that are more prominent and highly predictable, and requires an antecedent representation that it refers back to. In order for a proper interpretation to occur, the antecedent representation must be made accessible within the comprehender's mind and then aligned with the appropriate pronoun, so that the pronoun will have something to refer to. There are studies that suggest that there is a connection between pronoun prominence and the referent in a comprehender's cognitive state. Research has shown that prominent antecedent representations are more active compared to less prominent ones.

(i) "Where is my brush? Have you seen it?"

In sentence (i), there is an active representation of the antecedent my brush in the comprehender's mind and it coreferences with the following pronoun it. Pronouns tend to refer back to the salient object within the sentence, such as my brush in sentence (i).

Furthermore, the more active an antecedent representation is the more it is readily available for interpretation when a pronoun emerges, which are then useful for operations such as pronoun resolution.

(ii) "Where is my black bag with my brush and my hairties in it? Have you seen it?"

In sentence (ii), my brush is less prominent as there are other objects within the sentence that are more prominent, such as my black bag. The antecedent my black bag is more active in the representation in the comprehender's mind, as it is more prominent, and coreference for the pronoun it with the antecedent my brush is harder.

Based on findings from memory retrieval studies, Foraker suggests that prominent antecedents have a higher retrieval time when a following pronoun is introduced. Furthermore, when sentences are syntactically clefted, antecedent representations, such as pronouns, become more distinctive in working memory, and are easily integrable in subsequent discourse operations. In other words, antecedent pronouns, when placed in the beginning of sentences, are easier to remember as it is held within their focal attention. Thus, the sentences are easily interpreted and understood. They also found that gendered pronouns, such as he/she, increases the prominence compared to unambiguous pronouns, such as it. In addition, noun phrases also become more prominent in representation when syntactically clefted. It has also been suggested that there is a relationship between antecedent retrieval and its sensitivity to c-command restraints on quantificational binding, and that c-command facilitates the relational information, which help to retrieve antecedents and distinguish them from quantificational phrases that allows bound variable pronoun readings from quantificational phrases that do not.

=== Autism ===
Recent research by Khetrapal and Thornton (2017) questioned whether children with Autism Spectrum Disorders (ASD) are capable of computing the hierarchical structural relationship of c-command. Khetrapal and Thornton brought up the possibility that children with ASD may be relying on a form of linear strategy for reference assignment. The study aimed to investigate the status of c-command in children with ASD by testing participants on their interpretation of sentences which incorporated the usage of c-command and a linear strategy for reference assignment. Researchers found that children with high-functioning autism (HFA) did not show any difficulties with computing the hierarchical relationship of c-command. The results suggest that children with HFA do not have syntactic deficiency, but Kethrapal and Thornton stress that conducting further cross-linguistic investigation is essential.

== See also ==
- Anaphora
- Binding
- Coreference
- Government
- Government and Binding
- m-command
- Parse tree
- quantified expressions
