= Phonetic form =

In the field of linguistics, specifically in syntax, phonetic form (PF), also known as phonological form or the articulatory-perceptual (A-P) system, is a certain level of mental representation of a linguistic expression, derived from surface structure, and related to Logical Form. Phonetic form is the level of representation wherein expressions, or sentences, are assigned a phonetic representation, which is then pronounced by the speaker. Phonetic form takes surface structure as its input, and outputs an audible (or visual, in the case of sign languages), pronounced sentence.

This is part of the Y- or T-model of grammar within minimalist grammar, wherein the syntactic structure is constructed and then transferred (called spell-out) to both the Phonetic Form and the Logical Form. Operations in this branch of the model (between spell-out and pronunciation), the syntax-phonology interface, affect the pronunciation of the utterance but not its meaning.

Within distributed morphology (DM), this is where morphological structure is constructed, where the hierarchical syntactic structure is transformed into a linearized structure, and syntactic features are replaced with vocabulary items, among other things.

According to some theories of prosody, the prosodic representation is derived with direct reference to the hierarchical syntactic structure. For example, Selkirk (2011, and others) proposes that prosodic structure is constructed by a process of matching, although imperfectly, prosodic constituents to syntactic constituents. Kahnemuyipour (2009) demonstrates, using evidence from several languages, how information structure can be represented in the transfer from syntax to phonology, arguing that transfer can only be uni-directional, from syntax to phonology. Oltra-Massuet and Arregi (2005) argue that the metrical structure, as well, makes reference to hierarchical syntactic structure in Spanish. The extent of the interaction between the syntax and phonology at the interface is a matter of current debate.
