= List of syntactic phenomena =

A list of phenomena in syntax.

- Anaphora
- Agreement
- Answer ellipsis
- Antecedent-contained deletion
- Binding
- Case
- Clitics
- Control
- Coreference
- Differential Object Marking
- Discontinuity
- Do-support
- Dummy pronouns
- Ellipsis
- Ergative verb
- Exceptional case-marking
- Existential clauses
- Expletives
- Extraposition
- Gapping
- Heavy NP shift
- Inverse copula sentences
- Movement paradoxes
- Negative inversion
- Non-configurational language
- Parasitic gaps
- Pied-piping
- Pro-drop
- Pseudogapping
- Raising (linguistics)
- Reciprocal (grammar)
- Reflexive pronouns
- Reflexive verbs
- Right node raising
- Scrambling
- Shifting
- Sluicing
- Small clause
- Stripping
- Subject-auxiliary inversion
- Subject-verb inversion
- Topicalization
- Tough movement
- Unaccusative verbs
- V2 word order
- Verb phrase ellipsis
- Wh-movement
- Zero copula
