= Movement paradox =

Grammatical paradox

A movement paradox is a phenomenon of grammar that challenges the transformational approach to syntax. The importance of movement paradoxes is emphasized by those theories of syntax (e.g. lexical functional grammar, head-driven phrase structure grammar, construction grammar, most dependency grammars) that reject movement, i.e. the notion that discontinuities in syntax are explained by the movement of constituents.

== Syntactic movement ==
Given a transformational approach to syntax, the following related sentences are explained in terms of movement:

a. We talked about the fact that he was sick for days.
b. The fact that he was sick, we talked about ___ for days. - Example of topicalization

The underlined noun phrase, which contains a clause, is taken to have moved leftward in the second sentence, the blank marking its starting position. A transformational approach to syntax will explain all sorts of discontinuities (e.g. wh-fronting, topicalization, extraposition, scrambling, inversion, shifting) in this manner in terms of movement.

== Three types of movement paradoxes ==
Movement paradoxes challenge the movement account of discontinuities. They occur when the "moved" constituent is acceptable in its derived position but not in its base position, e.g.

a. *We talked about that he was sick for days. - Underlined clause is unacceptable before movement.
b. That he was sick, we talked about ___ for days. - Example of topicalization

a. *...but she did not met me. - Underlined verb phrase is unacceptable before movement
b. ?...but met me she did not ___. - Example of topicalization

a. *I aren't your friend. - Underlined copular verb is unacceptable before movement.
b. Aren't I ___ your friend? - Example of inversion

These data are difficult to explain in an analysis based on movement, since it is not evident how the b-sentence can be grammatical each time if it is derived by a movement operation applied to the corresponding a-example. The first example illustrates a movement paradox involving a clausal complement of the preposition about, the second a movement paradox involving competing forms of a non-finite verb (meet vs met), and the third a movement paradox involving a contracted form of the copula (aren't). To state the problem in other words, the movement analysis of the b-sentences has to explain the unexpected fact that the a-sentences are bad.

== A fourth type of movement paradox ==
Movement paradoxes are present in other languages as well. The so-called long passive in German presents a movement paradox that revolves around competing case forms, e.g.

a.	Gestern	wurde	versucht,	den	Wagen	zu reparieren.
	yesterday	was	tried	the-ACC	car	to repair	'One attempted to fix the car yesterday.'

b.	*Den	Wagen	wurde	gestern	versucht	zu reparieren.
	the-ACC	car	was	yesterday	tried	to repair	'One attempted to fix the car yesterday.'

c.	Der	Wagen	wurde	gestern	versucht	zu reparieren.
	the-NOM	car	was	yesterday	tried	to repair	'One attempted to fix the car yesterday.'

On the assumption that the noun phrase den Wagen is in its base position in the a-sentence, this noun phrase must be in a derived position in the other two sentences. The problem is evident in the competing case forms of the determiner (den vs. der). In the derived position at the front of the sentence, the determiner must appear in the nominative (der, not den), whereas when this noun phrase appears in its base position, the accusative of the determiner must appear (den, not der). The paradox is evident in the necessity that a change in case form accompany movement.

== See also ==
- Discontinuity
- Movement
