= Extraposition =

Syntactic discontinuity

Extraposition is a mechanism of syntax that alters word order in such a manner that a relatively "heavy" constituent appears later than its canonical position. (Note: This alteration is often referred to as right-branching, and in a right-to-left language like English, the constituent will move to the right of its usual position.) Extraposing a constituent results in a discontinuity and in this regard, it is unlike shifting, which does not generate a discontinuity. The extraposed constituent is separated from its governor by one or more words that dominate its governor. Two types of extraposition are acknowledged in theoretical syntax: standard cases where extraposition is optional and it-extraposition where extraposition is obligatory. Extraposition is motivated in part by a desire to reduce center embedding by increasing right-branching and thus easing processing, center-embedded structures being more difficult to process. Extraposition occurs frequently in English and related languages.

== Examples ==
Standard cases of extraposition are optional, although at times the extraposed version of the sentence is strongly preferred. The following pairs of sentences illustrate "normal" word order first followed by the same sentence with extraposition:

1. Someone [who[m]] we don't know left a message.
2. Someone left a message who[m] we don't know. – Extraposition of relative clause out of subject
1. Susan said something [that] nobody expected more than once.
2. Susan said something more than once that nobody expected. – Extraposition of relative clause out of object
1. Some guy with red hair was there.
2. Some guy was there with red hair. – Extraposition of prepositional phrase out of subject
1. How frustrated with their kids are they?
2. How frustrated are they with their kids? – Extraposition of prepositional phrase from predicative adjective phrase
1. %What that was so entertaining actually happened?
2. What actually happened that was so entertaining? – Extraposition of content clause from subject wh-element
1. %What that upset everyone do you think they did?
2. What do you think they did that upset everyone? – Extraposition of content clause from object wh-element

These examples illustrate a couple of basic facts about extraposition. One of these is that relatively "heavy" constituents are being extraposed (usually clauses and sometimes prepositional phrases). Another fact is that extraposition can occur out of subjects. This aspect of extraposition is unlike topicalization and wh-fronting, two other mechanisms that often generate discontinuities. Attempts to front expressions out of subjects fail in English. Another fact about extraposition is that sometimes it cannot occur beyond informationally heavy material.

1. Some guy with red hair was talking excessively.
2. *Some guy was talking excessively with red hair. – Failed attempt to extrapose prepositional phrase

This aspect of extraposition supports the insight that extraposed constituents should be informationally heavy. Extraposition likely fails in this case because with red hair cannot be construed as important information.

== Clause-bound ==
A further widely acknowledged fact about extraposition is that it is clause-bound. This aspect of extraposition is known as the right roof constraint. There is a "right roof" above which extraposition cannot occur. In other words, extraposition cannot occur out of an embedded clause:

1. That we think [that] the idea is good is no secret.
2. *That we think is no secret [that] the idea is good. – Failed attempt to extrapose out of a subject clause
1. Someone who thinks [that] Romney will win was talking non-stop.
2. *Someone who thinks was talking non-stop [that] Romney will win. – Failed attempt to extrapose out of a relative clause
1. Before it was certain [that] it would rain, we were planning a picnic.
2. *Before it was certain, we were planning a picnic [that] it would rain. – Failed attempt to extrapose out of an adjunct clause

This aspect of extraposition is similar to scrambling discontinuities, which cannot displace a constituent from one clause into another. It is unlike fronting discontinuities (topicalization and wh-fronting), which can easily front a constituent out of an (argument) clause, e.g.:

1. They mentioned [that] they like the coffee.
2. What did they mention [that] they like? – Successful wh-fronting out of an object clause

== It-extraposition ==
The term "extraposition" is also used to denote similar structures in which it appears. While certainly related to canonical cases, it-extraposition is different in at least one important respect: extraposition is not optional, but rather it is obligatory, e.g.

1. *It that I burned the potatoes was frustrating. – Failed sentence because extraposition is obligatory when it appears
2. It was frustrating that I burned the potatoes.
1. *Did it [that] this happened surprise you? – Failed sentence because extraposition is obligatory when it appears
2. Did it surprise you [that] this happened?
1. *We suggested it that we leave later than planned to them. – Failed sentence because extraposition is obligatory when it appears
2. We suggested it to them that we leave later than planned.
1. *Nobody believes it [that] Newt will get the nomination for a second. – Failed sentence because extraposition is obligatory when it appears
2. Nobody believes it for a second [that] Newt will get the nomination.

Another aspect of it-extraposition that distinguishes it from canonical cases is that the extraposed constituent is usually a clause; it-extraposition cannot extrapose a prepositional phrase. This fact can be explained by appealing to the status of it as a cataphor. In other words, it is pro-form of a sort; its appearance pushes the clause that it stands for to the end of the sentence. Since prepositional phrases cannot appear in the position of a clause, it should not be surprising that prepositional phrases cannot be it-extraposed.

== Motivation ==
Extraposition is motivated at least in part by the desire to reduce processing load. When extraposition occurs, it inevitably reduces center embedding and thus increases right-branching. Right-branching structures in English are known to be easier to process. The extent to which extraposition increases right-branching is illustrated below using both a phrase-structure analysis and a dependency-grammar analysis. The phrase-structure trees appear first above the dependency trees:

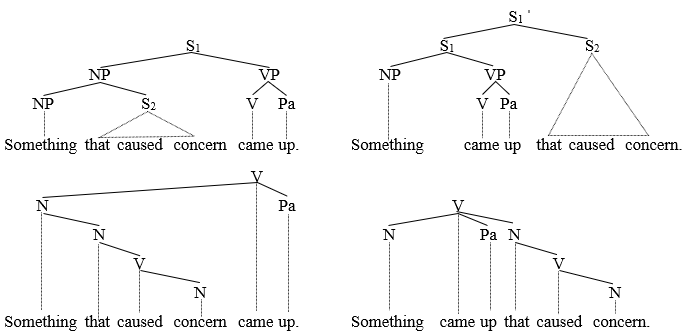
Extraposition (growing down to right)

The a-trees, which lack extraposition, extend down, whereas the b-trees, where extraposition is present, grow down and to the right. English, like many other languages, prefers to avoid trees that grow just down. Extraposition is one mechanism that increases rightward growth (shifting is another).

== Theoretical analyses ==
Theories of syntax vary in their analyses of extraposition. Derivational theories are likely to produce an analysis in terms of syntactic movement (or copying), and representational theories are likely to assume feature passing (instead of movement). The following trees illustrate these analyses. The movement-type analysis appears on the left in the a-trees, and the feature passing analysis on the right in the b-trees. The phrase structure trees appear again above the dependency trees.

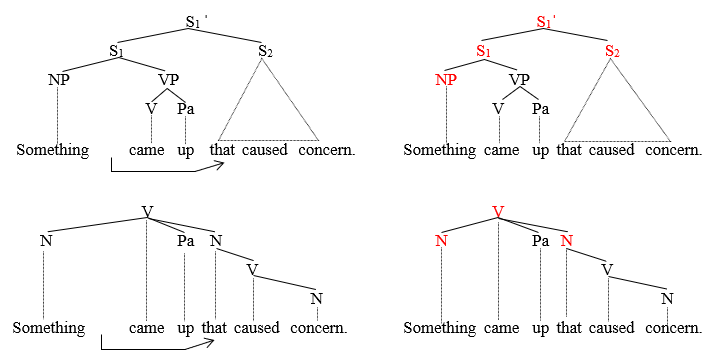
Extraposition (down to the right)

On the movement analysis in the a-trees, the embedded clause is first generated in its canonical position. To increase right-branching it then moves rightward (and upward in the case of the phrase structure analysis) to its surface position. On the feature passing analysis in the b-trees, no movement is involved. Instead, information about the extraposed constituent is passed along the path marked in red. This path extends from the extraposed constituent to what can be viewed as the governor of the extraposed constituent. The words in red in the dependency tree qualify as a concrete unit of syntax; they form a catena.

== See also ==
- Inversion
