= Answer ellipsis =

Shortened answer, such as "who walked the dog?" "Tom (did)"

Answer ellipsis (= answer fragments) is a type of ellipsis that occurs in answers to questions. Answer ellipsis appears very frequently in any dialogue, and it is present in probably all languages. Of the types of ellipsis mechanisms, answer fragments behave most like sluicing, a point that shall be illustrated below.

== Examples ==
Standard instances of answer ellipsis occur in answers to questions. A question is posed, and the answer is formulated in such a manner to be maximally efficient. Just the constituent that is focused by the question word is uttered. The elided material in the examples in this article is indicated using a smaller font and subscripts:

Q: Who walked the dog? A: Tom _{walked the dog}. - Subject noun as answer fragment
Q: Whom did you call? A: _{I called} Sam. - Object noun as answer fragment
Q: What did you try to do? A: _{I tried to} Fix the hard drive. - Verb phrase as answer fragment
Q: Whose house is too big? A: Fred's _{house is too big}. - Possessor as answer fragment
Q: When did they arrive? A: _{They arrived} At noon. - Temporal adjunct prepositional phrase as answer fragment
Q: Why will they resist our help? A: _{They will resist our help} Due to excessive pride. - Causal adjunct prepositional phrase as answer fragment

This sort of data could easily be expanded. An answer fragment is possible for any constituent that can be questioned using a question word. An important aspect of the elided material of answer ellipsis is that it usually does not correspond to a constituent. This fact is problematic for theories of ellipsis, a point which is examined below.

== Noteworthy traits ==
Answer ellipsis behaves curiously in a couple of noteworthy ways. The answer fragment should not, for instance, encompass more than the focused constituent:

Q: What did you try to begin to repair?

a. A: _{I tried to begin to repair} My bike.
b. A: _{I tried to begin to} *Repair my bike.
c. A: _{I tried to} *Begin to repair my bike.
d. A: _{I} *Tried to begin to repair my bike.
e. A: I tried to begin to repair my bike.

Either just the focused constituent (i.e. the constituent that is focused by the question word in the question) or the entire sentence must appear as the answer. If an intermediate constituent appears, the answer is unacceptable.

Another noteworthy aspect of answer ellipsis is that a negation can be part of the elided material. Answer ellipsis is like sluicing in this regard, but unlike gapping, stripping, VP-ellipsis, and pseudogapping, e.g.

Q: Who has not done their homework? A: Connor _{has not done his homework}. - Negation is part of elided material of answer ellipsis.

Tom did not do the problem, and I don't know why _{he did not do the problem}. - Negation is part of elided material of sluicing.

Sam did not say it twice, *and Susan _{did not say it} once. - Gapping fails to include negation in the ellipsis

Larry did not pose the question, *and Bill _{did not pose the question}. - Stripping fails to include the negation in the ellipsis

Christine has not exaggerated, *and Jerry has _{not exaggerated}, too. - VP-ellipsis fails to include the negation in the ellipsis

She does not want to date him more than *he does _{not want to date} her. - Pseudogapping fails to include the negation in the ellipsis

These data demonstrate that answer ellipsis and sluicing have something important in common that distinguishes them from other ellipsis mechanisms.

== Theoretical analyses ==
Theoretical accounts of answer ellipsis are faced with the same basic problem that challenges the accounts of other ellipsis mechanisms. This problem revolves around the fact that the elided material often does not form a constituent in surface syntax. The following trees illustrate the problem. The tree on the left is a constituency-based tree of a phrase structure grammar, and the tree on the right is the corresponding dependency-based tree of a dependency grammar:

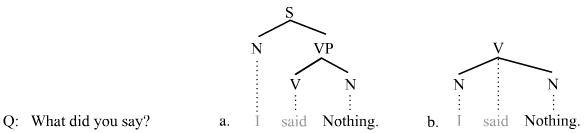

In both trees, the elided material I said, which is indicated using the lighter font shade, does not form as a constituent. In other words, it does not qualify as a complete subtree. The theory of ellipsis is therefore challenged to produce an analysis of such cases that can account for the fact that ellipsis appears to be eliding non-constituent units.

=== Movement first, ellipsis second ===
One prominent means of dealing with this problem is to assume that the answer fragment is first moved out of an encompassing constituent so that this encompassing constituent can then be elided. The following tree illustrates such an analysis in a phrase structure grammar:

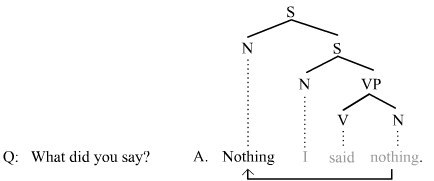

The object nothing is moved to the left out of the constituent S in such a manner that S (the lower S) can then be elided. This sort of analysis allows one to preserve the assumption that ellipsis mechanisms (in this case answer ellipsis) are eliding constituents. A constituent-based theory of syntax can therefore be maintained.

Analyses of fragment answers that incorporate movement of the remnant of ellipsis in the manner just sketched have a way of accounting for two important facts documented in the literature. First, in languages that require preposition pied-piping such as German, fragment answers that retain the preposition (pied-pipe it, on the movement analysis) are judged significantly more acceptable than those that do not retain it, a phenomenon related to what is known as the Preposition-Stranding Generalization (or Merchant's Generalization). Second, fragment answers appear to be sensitive to locality restrictions on movement, including islands:

Q: Does Abby speak the same Balkan language that Ben speaks?
A: *No, "Charlie".
A: No, she speaks the same Balkan language that "Charlie" speaks.
