= Topicalization =

Syntax mechanism

Topicalization is a mechanism of syntax that establishes an expression as the sentence or clause topic by having it appear at the front of the sentence or clause (as opposed to in a canonical position later in the sentence). This involves a phrasal movement of determiners, prepositions, and verbs to sentence-initial position. Topicalization often results in a discontinuity and is thus one of a number of established discontinuity types, the other three being wh-fronting, scrambling, and extraposition. Topicalization is also used as a constituency test; an expression that can be topicalized is deemed a constituent. The topicalization of arguments in English is rare, whereas circumstantial adjuncts are often topicalized. Most languages allow topicalization, and in some languages, topicalization occurs much more frequently and/or in a much less marked manner than in English. Topicalization in English has also received attention in the pragmatics literature.

== Examples ==
Typical cases of topicalization are illustrated with the following examples:

a. The boys roll rocks for entertainment.
b. For entertainment, the boys roll rocks. -Topicalization of the adjunct for entertainment

a. Everyone refused to answer because the pressure was too great.
b. Because the pressure was too great, everyone refused to answer. - Topicalization of the adjunct because the pressure was too great

a. I won't eat that pizza.
b. That pizza, I won't eat. - Topicalization of the object argument that pizza

a. I am terrified of those dogs.
b. Those dogs, I am terrified of. - Topicalization of the object argument those dogs

Assuming that the a-sentences represent canonical word order, the b-sentences contain instances of topicalization. The constituent in bold is fronted to establish it as topic. The first two examples, which use topicalized adjuncts, are typical, but the last two examples with topicalized object arguments are comparatively rare. The appearance of the demonstrative determiners that and those is important since without them, topicalization of an argument seems less acceptable: A pizza I won't eat, for example.

Topicalization can also occur across long distances:

a. I thought you said that Tom believes the explanation needs such examples.
b. Such examples I thought you said that Tom believes the explanation needs. - Topicalization of the object argument such examples over a long distance

== Further examples ==
Topicalization is similar to wh-movement insofar as the constituents that can be wh-fronted can also be topicalized:

a. Bill is living in that one house on the hill.
b. Which house is Bill living in? - Wh-fronting of NP resulting in preposition stranding
c. That one house on the hill Bill is living in. - Topicalization of NP resulting in preposition stranding

a. Shelly has indeed uncovered part of our plan.
b. What has Shelly indeed uncovered part of? - Wh-fronting out of object NP resulting in preposition stranding
c. Our plan Shelly has indeed uncovered part of. - Topicalization out of object NP resulting in preposition stranding

Also, topicalization is similar to wh-fronting insofar as the islands and barriers to wh-fronting are also islands and barriers to topicalization:

a. The description of his aunt was really funny.
b. *Whose aunt was the description of really funny? - Wh-fronting impossible out of a subject in English
c. *His aunt the description of was really funny. - Topicalization impossible out of a subject in English

a. He relaxes after he's played Starcraft.
b. *What does he relax after he's played? - Wh-fronting impossible out of adjunct clause
c. *Starcraft he relaxes after he's played. - Topicalization impossible out of adjunct clause

a. She approves of the suggestion to make pasta.
b. *What does she approve of the suggestion to make? - Wh-fronting impossible out of complex NP
c. *Pasta she approves of the suggestion to make. - Topicalization impossible out of complex NP

Those examples illustrate the similar behavior of topicalization and wh-fronting. Further data, which will not be produced here, could show, however, that topicalization is unlike the other two major discontinuity types: scrambling and extraposition.

== Theoretical analyses ==
The theoretical analysis of topicalization can vary greatly depending in part on the theory of sentence structure that one adopts. If one assumes the layered structures associated with many phrase structure grammars, all instances of topicalization will involve a discontinuity. If, in contrast, less layered structures are assumed as for example in dependency grammar, then many instances of topicalization do not involve a discontinuity, but rather just inversion. This point is illustrated here first using flatter structures that lack a finite VP-constituent (which means the entire sentence has the status of a large VP). Both constituency- and dependency-based analyses are given. The example itself is a piece of Yoda wisdom (as he speaks to Anakin), and is certainly of questionable acceptability in this regard. It is, however, perfectly understandable:

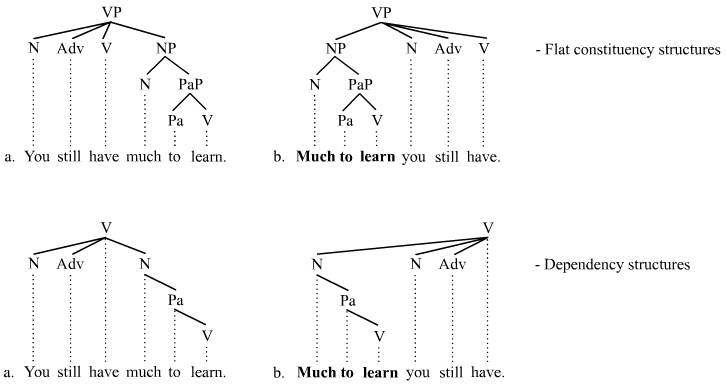
Topicalization in flat constituency and dependency structures

The upper two trees show the analysis using flat constituency-based structures that lack a finite VP constituent, and the lower two trees are dependency-based, whereby dependency inherently rejects the existence of finite VP-constituents. The noteworthy aspect of these examples is that topicalization does not result in a discontinuity, since there are no crossing lines in the trees. What this means is that such cases can be analyzed purely in terms of inversion. The topicalized expression simply "inverts" to the other side of its head.

Instead of the flat trees just examined, most constituency grammars posit more layered structures that include a finite VP constituent. These more layered structures are likely to address topicalization in terms of movement or copying, as illustrated with the following two trees:

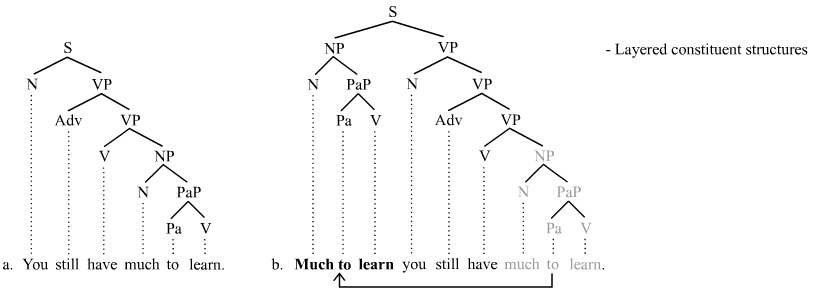
Topicalization in layered constituency structures

Tree a. shows the canonical word order again, and tree b. illustrates what is known as the movement or copying analysis. The topicalized expression is first generated in its canonical position but is then copied to the front of the sentence, the original then being deleted.

The movement analysis of discontinuities is one possible way to address those instances of topicalization that cannot be explained in terms of inversion. An alternative explanation is feature passing. One assumes that the topicalized expression is not moved or copied to the clause-initial position, but rather it is "base" generated there. Instead of movement, there is feature passing, however. A link of a sort is established between the topicalized expression and its governor. The link is the path along which information about the topicalized expression is passed to the governor of that expression. A piece of Yoda wisdom is again used for illustration, the full sentence being Careful you must be when sensing the future, Anakin:

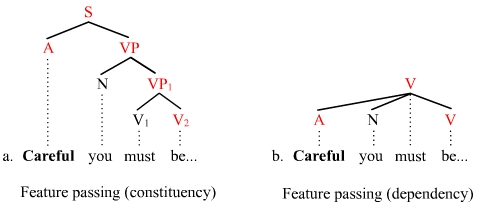
Feature passing (constituency and dependency)

The nodes in red mark the path of feature passing. Features (=information) about the topicalized expression are passed rightward through (and down) the tree structure to the governor of that expression. This path is present in both analyses, i.e. in the constituency-based a-analysis on the left and in the dependency-based b-analysis on the right. Since topicalization can occur over long distances, feature passing must also occur over long distances. The final example shows a dependency-based analysis of a sentence where the feature passing path is quite long:

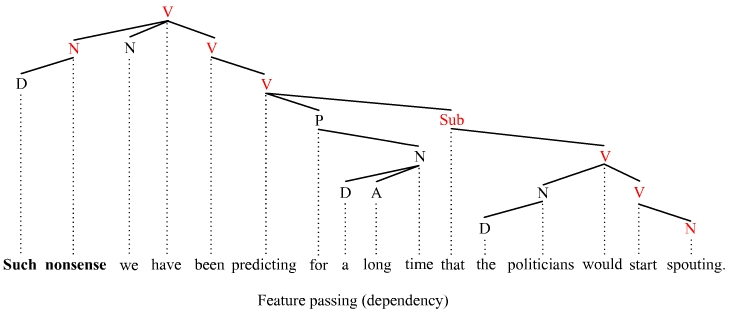
Long distance feature passing (dependency)

Information about the topicalized such nonsense is passed along the path marked in red down to the governor of the topicalized expression spouting. The words corresponding to the nodes in red form a catena (Latin for 'chain', plural catenae). A theory of topicalization is then built up in part by examining the nature of these catenae for feature passing.

== See also ==
- Catena (linguistics)
- Constituent (linguistics)
- Dependency grammar
- Discontinuity (linguistics)
- Phrase structure grammar
