= Branching (linguistics) =

Analysis of sentence structure

In linguistics, branching refers to the shape of the parse trees that represent the structure of sentences. Assuming that the language is being written or transcribed from left to right, parse trees that grow down and to the right are right-branching, and parse trees that grow down and to the left are left-branching. The direction of branching reflects the position of heads in phrases, and in this regard, right-branching structures are head-initial, whereas left-branching structures are head-final. English has both right-branching (head-initial) and left-branching (head-final) structures, although it is more right-branching than left-branching. Some languages such as Japanese and Turkish are almost fully left-branching (head-final). Some languages are mostly right-branching (head-initial).

== Examples ==
Languages typically construct phrases with a head word (or nucleus) and zero or more dependents (modifiers). The following phrases show the phrase heads in bold.

Examples of left-branching phrases (= head-final phrases):

the house - Noun phrase (NP)
very happy - Adjective phrase (AP)
too slowly - Adverb phrase (AdvP)

Examples of right-branching phrases (= head-initial phrases):

laugh loudly - Verb phrase (VP)
with luck - Prepositional phrase (PP)
that it happened - Subordinator phrase (SP = subordinate clause)

Examples of phrases that contain both left- and right-branching (= head-medial phrases):

the house there - Noun phrase (NP)
very happy with it - Adjective phrase (AP)
only laugh loudly - Verb phrase (VP)

Concerning phrases such as the house and the house there, this article assumes the traditional NP analysis, meaning that the noun is deemed to be head over the determiner. On a DP-analysis (determiner phrase), the phrase the house would be right-branching instead of left-branching.

== Tree structures ==
Left- and right-branching structures are illustrated with the trees that follow. Each example appears twice, once according to a constituency-based analysis associated with a phrase structure grammar and once according to a dependency-based analysis associated with a dependency grammar. The first group of trees illustrate left-branching:

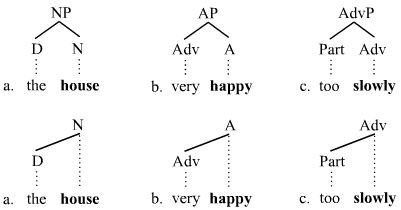
Branching picture 1

The upper row shows the constituency-based structures, and the lower row the dependency-based structures. In the constituency-based structures, left-branching is present (but not really visible) in so far as the non-head daughter is to the left of the head. In the corresponding dependency-based structures in the lower row, the left-branching is clear; the dependent appears to the left of its head, the branch extending down to the left. The following structures demonstrate right-branching:

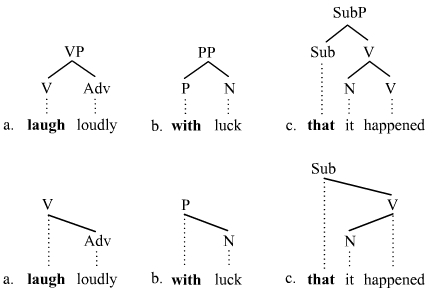
Branching picture 2

The upper row again shows the constituency-based structures, and the lower row the dependency-based structures. The constituency-based structures are right-branching insofar as the non-head daughter is to the right of the head. This right-branching is completely visible in the lower row of dependency-based structures, where the branch extends down to the right. The (c)-examples contain one instance of right-branching (the upper branch) and one instance of left-branching (the lower branch). The following trees illustrate phrases that combine both types of branching:

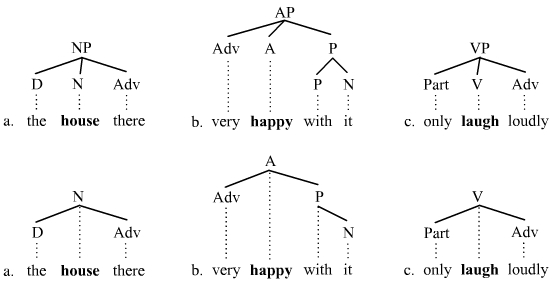
Branching picture 3

The combination of left- and right-branching is now completely visible in both the constituency- and dependency-based trees. The head appears in a medial position, which means that the phrase combines both types of branching. Note that the (b)-trees also contain a prepositional phrase that is an instance of pure right-branching.

== Full trees ==
The nature of branching is most visible with full trees. The following trees have been chosen to illustrate the extent to which a structure can be entirely left- or entirely right-branching. The following sentence is completely left-branching. The constituency-based trees are on the left, and the dependency-based trees are on the right:

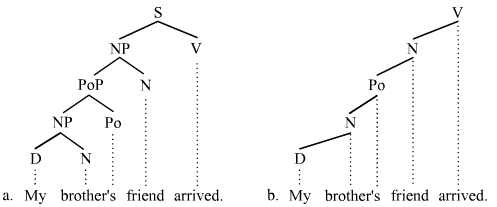
Branching picture 4

The category Po (= possessive) is used to label possessive 's. The following sentence is completely right-branching:

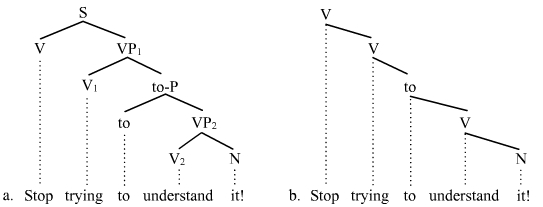
Branching picture 5

Most structures in English are, however, not completely left- or completely right-branching, but rather they combine both. The following trees illustrate what can be seen as a stereotypical combination of left- and right-branching in English:

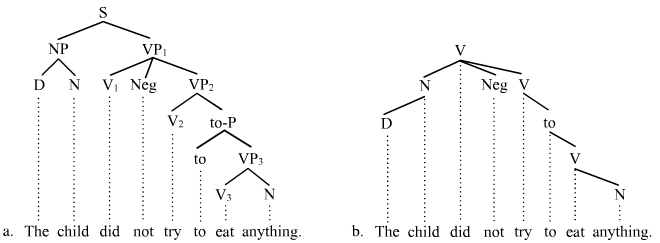
Branching picture 6

Determiners (e.g. the) always and subjects (e.g. the child) usually appear on left branches in English, but infinitival verbs (e.g. try, eat) and the verb particle to usually appear on right branches. In the big picture, right-branching structures tend to outnumber the left-branching structures in English, which means that trees usually grow down to the right.

== X-bar schema ==
The X-bar schema combines left- and right-branching. The standard X-bar schema has the following structure:

Branching picture 7

This structure is both left- and right branching. It is left-branching insofar as the bar-level projection of the head (X') follows the specifier, but it is right-branching insofar as the actual head (X^{0}) precedes the complement. Despite these conflicting traits, most standard X-bar structures (in English) are more right-branching than left-branching because specifiers tend to be less complex (i.e. fewer words) than complements.

== Binary vs. n-ary branching ==
Much work in government and binding theory (GB), the minimalist program (MP), and lexical functional grammar (LFG) assumes all branching to be binary. Other theories (both constituency- and dependency-based ones), e.g. early transformational grammar, head-driven phrase structure grammar, meaning-text theory, word grammar, etc. allow for n-ary branching. This distinction can have a profound impact on the overall nature of the theory of syntax. The two main possibilities in a phrase structure grammar are illustrated with the following trees:

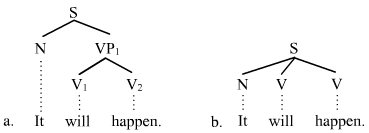
Branching picture 8

The binary branching on the left is closely associated with the structures of GB, MP, and LFG, and it is similar to what the X-bar schema assumes. The n-ary branching structure on the right is a more traditional approach to branching. One can muster arguments for both approaches. For instance, the critics of the strictly binary branching structures charge that the strict binarity is motivated more by a desire for theoretical purity than by empirical observation.

Strictly binary branching structures increase the amount of syntactic structure (number of nodes) to the upper limit of what is possible, whereas flatter n-ary branching tends to restrict the amount of structure that the theory can assume. Worth noting in this area is that the more layered the syntactic structures are, the more discontinuities can occur, which means the component of the theory that addresses discontinuities must play a greater role. Given the flatter structures associated with n-ary branching, certain phenomena (e.g. inversion and shifting) do not result in discontinuities, a fact that reduces the role that the component for discontinuities must play in the theory.

== Tendencies ==
As stated above, the main branching trait for a language is just a tendency and it often shows exceptions. Spanish, for example, while overwhelmingly right-branching, puts numeral modifiers before nouns and, in certain cases, objects before verbs. Languages like English or Swedish, though regarded as being right-branching because the main verbs precede direct objects, place adjectives and numerals before their nouns. On the contrary, Northwest Caucasian languages such as Ubykh or Abkhaz are strongly left-branching but put adjectives after nouns.

Some languages, however, are exclusively left-branching or right-branching. Japanese and most other languages of northeastern Asia and the Indian subcontinent, as well as the Turkic languages, are practically a model for rigidly left-branching languages. The Mon–Khmer and Austronesian languages of southeast Asia and many African languages come close to rigidly right-branching, with numerals as well as adjectives following their nouns and with degree words like very, too, extremely, and quite following the adjectives they modify.

== See also ==
- Catena
- Complement (linguistics)
- Dependency grammar
- Head
- Head-directionality parameter
- Phrase structure grammar
- Specifier
- Word order
- X-bar theory
