= Presentative (linguistics) =

A presentative, or presentational, is a word or a syntactic structure which presents, or introduces, an entity, bringing it to the attention of the addressee. Typically, the entity thus introduced will serve as the topic of the subsequent discourse. For example, the construction with there in the following English sentence is a presentative:

There appeared a cat on the window sill.

In French, one of the major uses of the words voici and voilà is presentative, as in the following example:

Voici le sceau de Charlemagne.
PRESTT DEF seal GEN Charlemagne
'This is the seal of Charlemagne.'

However, the most common presentative in French is the (il) y a formula (from the verb avoir 'have'), as in the following sentence:

ya un policier qui arrive.
PRESTT a policeman REL arrives
'There is a policeman who arrives.'

Similarly to French il y a, in Chinese the existential verb yǒu 'have' is often used as a presentative to introduce new entities into discourse:

Kàn! Yǒu rén tōu nǐde miànbāo!.
Look PRESTT people steal your bread.
'Look! There’s someone [who] stole your bread!.'

In Maybrat, a likely language isolate of West Papua, there is a dedicated presentative prefix me- which combines with demonstratives. It contrasts with other prefixes like pe- (forming adverbs, 'there') or re- and we- (for attributives, 'this man'). This contrast is illustrated in the following three examples with the demonstrative -to, which is used for non-masculine referents close to the speaker:

m-ama me-to
U-come PRESTT-DEM
'Here she comes.'

y-tien pe-to
he-sleep area.ADV-DEM
'He sleeps near here.'

fai re-to
woman SPEC-DEM
'this woman'

Special word order configurations can also be used to introduce foregrounded entities into discourse, that is, to realise a presentational function. This is the case of inverted sentences, where the subject of SV(O) languages appears in a post-verbal position. In the following spoken Chinese sentence, the agent of the motion verb lái 'come', which usually occupies the preverbal position, occurs after the verb because it denotes a discourse-new entity:

Nèi tiān túránjiān ne, lái-le hǎoxiē-ge fēijī.
That day suddenly PAUS come-PFV quite.a.few-CL airplane.
lit. 'Suddenly that day, came quite a few airplanes.'

A subtype of inverted sentence is called locative inversion, since in many languages the preverbal position is filled with a locative expression. English, especially written English, has this kind of structure:

In a little white house lived two rabbits.

In a hole in the ground there lived a hobbit.
