= Syntax =

Study of the formation of composite units

In linguistics, syntax (/ˈsɪntæks/ SIN-taks) is the study of how words and morphemes combine to form well-formed larger units such as phrases and sentences. Central concerns in this area of linguistics include word order, grammatical relations, hierarchical sentence structure (constituency), agreement, cross-linguistic variation, and the relationship between structure and meaning (semantics). Diverse approaches, such as generative grammar and functional grammar, have been proposed as ways to model the human mental grammars that form and interpret sentences.

In logic, syntax is the study of how strings of symbols form well-formed formulas in formal languages.

== Etymology ==
The word syntax comes from the ancient Greek word σύνταξις, meaning an orderly or systematic arrangement, which consists of σύν- (syn-, "together" or "alike"), and τάξις (táxis, "arrangement"). In Hellenistic Greek, this also specifically developed a use referring to the grammatical order of words, with a slightly altered spelling: συντάσσειν. The English term, which first appeared in 1548, is partly borrowed from Latin (syntaxis) and Greek, though the Latin term developed from Greek.

== Topics ==
The field of syntax has a number of topics that a syntactic theory is designed to explain. The relation between the topics is treated differently in different theories, and some of them may not be considered to be distinct but instead to be derived from one another (e.g., word order can be seen as the result of movement rules derived from grammatical relations).

=== Sequencing of subject, verb, and object ===
One basic description of a language's syntax is the sequence in which the subject (S), verb (V), and object (O) usually appear in sentences. Over 85% of languages usually place the subject first, either in the sequence SVO or the sequence SOV. The other possible sequences are VSO, VOS, OVS, and OSV, the last three of which are rare. Some languages have no dominant order for these three sentence elements. In most generative theories of syntax, these surface differences arise from a complex clausal phrase structure, and each order may be compatible with multiple derivations. Word order can also reflect the semantics or function of the ordered elements.

=== Grammatical relations ===
Another description of a language considers the set of possible grammatical relations in a language or in general and how they behave in relation to one another in the morphosyntactic alignment of the language. The description of grammatical relations can also reflect transitivity, passivization, and head-dependent-marking or other agreement. Languages have different criteria for grammatical relations. For example, subjecthood criteria may have implications for how the subject is referred to from a relative clause or coreferential with an element in an infinite clause.

=== Constituency ===
Constituency is the feature of being a constituent and how words can work together to form a constituent (or phrase). Constituents are often moved as units, and the constituent can be the domain of agreement. Some languages allow discontinuous phrases in which words belonging to the same constituent are not immediately adjacent but are broken up by other constituents (tmesis). Constituents may be recursive, as they may consist of other constituents, potentially of the same type.

== Early history ==
The Aṣṭādhyāyī of Pāṇini, from c. 4th century BC in Ancient India, is often cited as an example of a premodern work that approaches the sophistication of a modern syntactic theory since works on grammar had been written long before modern syntax came about. In the West, the school of thought that came to be known as "traditional grammar" began with the work of Dionysius Thrax.

For centuries, a framework known as grammaire générale, first expounded in 1660 by Antoine Arnauld and Claude Lancelot in a book of the same title, dominated work in syntax; its basic premise is the assumption that language is a direct reflection of thought processes, and so there is a single most natural way to express a thought.

However, in the 19th century, with the development of historical-comparative linguistics, linguists began to realize the sheer diversity of human language and to question fundamental assumptions about the relationship between language and logic. It became apparent that there was no such thing as the most natural way to express a thought and so logic could no longer be relied upon as a basis for studying the structure of language.

The Port-Royal grammar modeled the study of syntax upon that of logic. (Indeed, large parts of Port-Royal Logic were copied or adapted from the Grammaire générale.) Syntactic categories were identified with logical ones, and all sentences were analyzed in terms of "subject – copula – predicate". Initially, that view was adopted even by the early comparative linguists such as Franz Bopp.

The central role of syntax within theoretical linguistics became clear only in the 20th century, which could reasonably be called the "century of syntactic theory" as far as linguistics is concerned. (For a detailed and critical survey of the history of syntax in the last two centuries, see the monumental work by Giorgio Graffi (2001).)

== Theoretical syntactic models ==
=== Dependency grammar ===
Dependency grammar is an approach to sentence structure in which syntactic units are arranged according to the dependency relation, as opposed to the constituency relation of phrase structure grammars. Dependencies are directed links between words. The (finite) verb is seen as the root of all clause structure and all the other words in the clause are either directly or indirectly dependent on this root (i.e. the verb). Some prominent dependency-based theories of syntax are the following:

- Recursive categorical syntax, or algebraic syntax
- Functional generative description
- Meaning–text theory
- Operator grammar
- Word grammar

Lucien Tesnière (1893–1954) is widely seen as the father of modern dependency-based theories of syntax and grammar. He argued strongly against the binary division of the clause into subject and predicate that is associated with the grammars of his day (S → NP VP) and remains at the core of most phrase structure grammars. In place of that division, he positioned the verb as the root of all clause structure.

=== Categorial grammar ===
Categorial grammar is an approach in which constituents combine as function and argument, according to combinatory possibilities specified in their syntactic categories. For example, other approaches might posit a rule that combines a noun phrase (NP) and a verb phrase (VP), but CG would posit a syntactic category NP and another NP\S, read as "a category that searches to the left (indicated by \) for an NP (the element on the left) and outputs a sentence (the element on the right)." Thus, the syntactic category for an intransitive verb is a complex formula representing the fact that the verb acts as a function word requiring an NP as an input and produces a sentence level structure as an output. The complex category is notated as (NP\S) instead of V. The category of transitive verb is defined as an element that requires two NPs (its subject and its direct object) to form a sentence. That is notated as (NP/(NP\S)), which means, "A category that searches to the right (indicated by /) for an NP (the object) and generates a function (equivalent to the VP) which is (NP\S), which in turn represents a function that searches to the left for an NP and produces a sentence."

Tree-adjoining grammar is a categorial grammar that adds in partial tree structures to the categories.

=== Stochastic/probabilistic grammars/network theories ===
Theoretical approaches to syntax that are based upon probability theory are known as stochastic grammars. One common implementation of such an approach makes use of a neural network or connectionism.

=== Functional grammars ===
Functionalist models of grammar study the form–function interaction by performing a structural and a functional analysis.

- Functional discourse grammar (Dik)
- Prague linguistic circle
- Role and reference grammar (RRG)
- Systemic functional grammar

=== Generative syntax ===
Generative syntax is the study of syntax within the overarching framework of generative grammar. Generative theories of syntax typically propose analyses of grammatical patterns using formal tools such as phrase structure grammars augmented with additional operations such as syntactic movement. Their goal in analyzing a particular language is to specify rules which generate all and only the expressions which are well-formed in that language. In doing so, they seek to identify innate domain-specific principles of linguistic cognition, in line with the wider goals of the generative enterprise. Generative syntax is among the approaches that adopt the principle of the autonomy of syntax by assuming that meaning and communicative intent is determined by the syntax, rather than the other way around.

Generative syntax was proposed in the late 1950s by Noam Chomsky, building on earlier work by Zellig Harris, Louis Hjelmslev, and others. Since then, numerous theories have been proposed under its umbrella:

- Transformational grammar (TG) (Original theory of generative syntax laid out by Chomsky in Syntactic Structures in 1957)
- Government and binding theory (GB) (revised theory in the tradition of TG developed mainly by Chomsky in the 1970s and 1980s)
- Minimalist program (MP) (a reworking of the theory out of the GB framework published by Chomsky in 1995)

Other theories that find their origin in the generative paradigm are:

- Arc pair grammar
- Generalized phrase structure grammar (GPSG)
- Generative semantics
- Head-driven phrase structure grammar (HPSG)
- Lexical functional grammar (LFG)
- Nanosyntax
- Relational grammar (RG)
- Harmonic grammar (HG)

=== Cognitive and usage-based grammars ===
The Cognitive Linguistics framework stems from generative grammar but adheres to evolutionary, rather than Chomskyan, linguistics. Cognitive models often recognise the generative assumption that the object belongs to the verb phrase. Cognitive frameworks include the following:

- Cognitive grammar
- Construction grammar (CxG)
- Emergent grammar

== See also ==
- Cartographic syntax
- Metasyntax
- Musical syntax
- Semiotics
- Syntactic category
- Syntax (journal)
- Syntax (programming languages)
- Syntax–semantics interface
- Usage (language)

=== Syntactic terms ===
- List of syntactic phenomena
- Adjective
- Adjective phrase
- Adjunct
- Adpositional phrase
- Adverb
- Antecedent
- Appositive
- Argument
- Article
- Aspect
- Attributive adjective and predicative adjective
- Auxiliary verb
- Branching
- c-command
- Category
- Catena
- Clause
- Closed class word
- Comparative
- Complement
- Compound noun and adjective
- Conjugation
- Conjunction
- Constituent
- Coordination
- Crossover
- Dangling modifier
- Declension
- Dependency grammar
- Dependent marking
- Determiner
- Dual (form for two)
- Endocentric
- Finite verb
- Function word
- Gender
- Gerund
- Government
- Head
- Head marking
- Infinitive
- Inversion
- Lexical item
- Logical form (linguistics)
- m-command
- Measure word (classifier)
- Merge
- Modal particle
- Modal verb
- Modifier
- Mood
- Movement
- Movement paradox
- Nanosyntax
- Non-finite verb
- Noun
- Noun ellipsis
- Noun phrase
- Number
- Object
- Open class word
- Part of speech
- Particle
- Periphrasis
- Person
- Personal pronoun
- Phrasal verb
- Phrase
- Phrase structure grammar
- Plural
- Predicate
- Predicative expression
- Preposition and postposition
- Pronoun
- Grammatical relation
- Restrictiveness
- Right node raising
- Scrambling
- Selection
- Sentence
- Separable verb
- Singular
- Subcategorization
- Subject
- Subordination
- Superlative
- Tense
- Uninflected word
- V2 word order
- Valency
- Verb
- Verb phrase
- Voice
- Word order
- X-bar theory
