= Wh-movement =

Form of linguistic discontinuity

In linguistics, wh-movement (also known as wh-fronting, wh-extraction, or wh-raising) is the formation of syntactic dependencies involving interrogative words. An example in English is the dependency formed between what and the object position of doing in "What are you doing?". Interrogative forms are sometimes known within English linguistics as wh-words, such as what, when, where, who, and why, but also include other interrogative words, such as how. This dependency has been used as a diagnostic tool in syntactic studies as it can be observed to interact with other grammatical constraints.

In languages with wh-movement, sentences or clauses with a wh-word show a non-canonical word order that places the wh-word (or phrase containing the wh-word) at or near the front of the sentence or clause ("Whom are you thinking about?") instead of the canonical position later in the sentence ("I am thinking about you"). Leaving the wh-word in its canonical position is called wh-in-situ and in English occurs in echo questions and polar questions in informal speech.

Wh-movement is one of the most studied forms of linguistic discontinuity. It is observed in many languages and plays a key role in the theories of long-distance dependencies.

The term wh-movement stemmed from early generative grammar in the 1960s and 1970s and was a reference to the theory of transformational grammar, in which the interrogative expression always appears in its canonical position in the deep structure of a sentence but can move leftward from that position to the front of the sentence/clause in the surface structure. Although other theories of syntax do not use the mechanism of movement in the transformative sense, the term wh-movement (or equivalent terms, such as wh-fronting, wh-extraction, or wh-raising) is widely used to denote the phenomenon, even in theories that do not model long-distance dependencies as a movement.

== Basic examples ==
The following examples of sentence pairs illustrate wh-movement in main clauses in English: each (a) example has the canonical word order of a declarative sentence in English, while each (b) sentence has undergone wh-movement, whereby the wh-word has been fronted in order to form a direct question.

Wh-fronting of whom, which corresponds to the direct object Tesnière.

(1a) Tom has been reading Tesnière.
(1b) Whom has Tom been reading?

Wh-fronting of what, which corresponds to the prepositional object syntax.

(2a) She should stop talking about syntax.
(2b) What should she stop talking about?

Wh-fronting of when, which corresponds to the temporal adjunct tomorrow.

(3a) They want to visit us tomorrow.
(3b) When do they want to visit us?

Wh-fronting of what, which corresponds to the predicative adjective happy.

(4a) She is happy.
(4b) What is she?

Wh-fronting of where, which corresponds to the prepositional phrase to school.

(5a) She is going to school.
(5b) Where is she going?

Wh-fronting of how, which corresponds to the adverb phrase well.

(6a) They are doing well.
(6b) How are they doing?

These examples illustrate that wh-movement occurs when a constituent is questioned that appears to the right of the finite verb in the corresponding declarative sentence. The main clause remains in V2 word order, with the interrogative fronted to first position while the finite verb stays in second position. Do-support is often needed to enable wh-fronting in such cases, which are reliant on subject–auxiliary inversion.

=== Subject "fronting" ===
When the subject is questioned, it is unclear whether wh-fronting has occurred because the default position of the subject is clause-initial. In the example sentence pair below, the subject Fred already appears at the front of the sentence where the interrogative is placed.

a. Fred is working hard.
b. Who is working hard?

Some theories of syntax maintain that this constitutes a wh-movement, and analyze such cases as if the interrogative subject has moved up the syntactic hierarchy; however, other theories observe that the surface string of words remains the same, and therefore, no movement has occurred.

=== Distance of movement ===
In many cases, wh-fronting can occur regardless of how far away its canonical location is, as seen in the following set of examples:

a. Whom does Mary like __?
b. Whom does Bob know that Mary likes __?
c. Whom does Carl believe that Bob knows that Mary likes __?

The interrogative whom is the direct object of the verb like in each of these examples. The dependency relation between the canonical, empty position and the wh-expression appears to be unbounded, in the sense that there is no upper bound on how deeply embedded within the given sentence the empty position may appear.

== Wh-expressions without wh-movement ==
Wh-movement typically occurs when forming questions in English. There are certain forms of questions in which wh-movement does not occur (aside from when the question word serves as the subject and so is already fronted):

1. Echo questions: Speaker confirming what they thought they've heard.
  - You bought what?
2. Quiz questions or specific questions: Asking for detailed specific information.
  - George Orwell was born in which country?
3. Multiple interrogatives in a single sentence.
  - Who bought what?
4. Expected questions: Occur when new information is expected.

Other languages may leave wh-expressions in-situ (in base position) more often, such as Slavic languages. In French, for instance, wh-movement is often optional in certain matrix clauses. Mandarin and Russian also possess wh-expressions without obligatory wh-movement.

In-situ questions are different from wh-fronted questions in that they result from no movement at all, which tends to be morphologically or pragmatically conditioned.

== In subordinate clauses ==
The basic examples above demonstrate wh-movement in main clauses in order to form a direct question. Wh-movement can also occur in subordinate clauses, although its behavior in subordinate clauses differs in word order.

=== In indirect questions ===
In English, wh-movement occurs in subordinate clauses to form an indirect question. While wh-fronting occurs in both direct and indirect questions, there is a key word order difference, as illustrated with the following examples:

a. Fred will ask Jill to leave.
b. Whom will Fred ask to leave? – Direct question
c. I wonder whom Fred will ask to leave. – Indirect question

a. Sam likes to get news about hurricanes.
b. What does Sam like to get news about? – Direct question; do-support introduced
c. They asked what Sam likes to get news about. – Indirect question

a. Larry stayed home due to the weather.
b. Why did Larry stay home? – Direct question; do-support introduced
c. Nobody knows why Larry stayed home. – Indirect question

In indirect questions, while the interrogative is still fronted to the first position of the clause, the subject is instead placed in second position, and the verb appears in third position, forming a V3 word order.

=== In relative clauses ===
Although many examples of wh-movement form questions, wh-movement also occurs in relative clauses. Many relative pronouns in English have the same form as the corresponding interrogative words (which, who, where, etc.). Relative clauses are subordinate clauses, so the same V3 word order occurs.

a. I read Fred's paper.
b. Fred's paper, which I read – Wh-fronting in relative clause

a. John likes the governor.
b. the governor whom John likes – Wh-fronting in relative clause

a. Fred reads the paper in the coffee shop.
b. the coffee shop where Fred reads the paper – Wh-fronting in relative clause

The relative pronouns have fronted in the subordinate clauses of the b. examples. The characteristic V3 word order is obligatory, just as in other subordinate clauses.

== Pied-piping ==
Many instances of wh-fronting involve pied-piping, where the word that is moved pulls an entire encompassing phrase to the front of the clause with it. Pied-piping was first identified by John R. Ross in his 1967 dissertation.

=== Obligatory pied-piping ===
In some cases of wh-fronting, pied-piping is obligatory, and the entire encompassing phrase must be fronted for the sentence to be grammatically correct. In the following examples, the moved phrase is underlined:

a. Susan is reading Fred's novel.
b. Whose novel is Susan reading? – Pied-piping of novel
c. *Whose is Susan reading novel? – Sentence is incorrect because pied-piping has not occurred

a. The music is very loud.
b. How loud is the music? – Pied-piping of loud
c. *How is the music loud? – Sentence is incorrect because pied-piping has not occurred

These examples illustrate that pied-piping is often necessary when the wh-word is inside a noun phrase or adjective phrase. Pied-piping is motivated in part by the barriers and islands to extraction (see below). When the wh-word appears underneath a blocking category or in an island, the entire encompassing phrase must be fronted.

=== Optional pied-piping ===
There are other cases where pied-piping is optional. In English, this occurs most notably when the fronted word is the object of a prepositional phrase. A formal register will pied-pipe the preposition, whereas more colloquial English prefers to leave the preposition in situ:

a. She revealed her secret to Tom.
b. To whom did she reveal her secret? – Pied-piping of preposition associated with a formal register
c. Whom did she reveal her secret to? – Pied-piping absent in colloquial English

a. He is hiding behind the red door.
b. Behind which door is he hiding? – Pied-piping of preposition associated with a formal register
c. Which door is he hiding behind? – Pied-piping of preposition absent in colloquial English; pied-piping of noun door still obligatory

The c. examples are cases of preposition stranding, which is possible in colloquial English but not allowed in many languages that are related to English. For instance, preposition stranding is largely absent from many of the other Germanic languages, and it may be completely absent from the Romance languages. Prescriptive grammars often claim that preposition stranding should be avoided in English as well, although it may feel artificial or stilted to a native speaker to move the preposition.

== Extraction islands ==
A syntactic island is a construction from which extracting an element leads to an ungrammatical or marginal sentence. For example:

*What did you wonder whether Lisa invented __?

These types of phrases, also referred to as extraction islands or simply islands, do not allow wh-movement to occur. John R. Ross proposed and described four types of islands: Complex-Noun Phrase Constraints (CNPC), Coordinate Structure Constraint (CSC), Left Branch Condition, and Sentential Subject Constraint. Configurations showing clear island restrictions have also been called wh-islands, complex noun phrases, and adjunct islands.

=== Adjunct islands ===
An adjunct island is a type of island formed from an adjunct clause. Wh-movement is not possible from an adjunct clause. Adjunct clauses include clauses introduced by because, if, and when, as well as relative clauses. Instead, a question would be formed by keeping the interrogative in situ. For example:

a. You went home because you needed to do that.
b. *What did you go home because you needed to do __? – The attempt to extract out of an adjunct clause fails
c. You went home because you needed to do what?

a. Alex likes the woman who wears extravagant rings.
b. *What does Alex like the woman who wears __? – The attempt to extract out of an adjunct clause fails
c. Alex likes the woman who wears what?

=== Wh-islands ===
A wh-island is created by an embedded sentence that is introduced by a wh-word, creating a dependent clause. Wh-islands are weaker than adjunct islands, and violating them results in a sentence that at minimum sounds ungrammatical to a native speaker.

a. John wonders where Eric went to buy a gift.
b. ??What does John wonder where Eric went to buy __? – The attempt to extract out of a wh-island is at best strongly marginal

a. Susan asked why Sam was waiting for Fred.
b. *Whom did Susan ask why Sam was waiting for __? – The attempt to extract out of a wh-island fails

The b. sentences are strongly marginal or unacceptable because they attempt to extract an expression out of a wh-island. This occurs because both wh-words are part of a DP. It would not be possible to move the bottom wh-word to the top of the structure, as they would both interfere. In order to get a grammatical result, a proper wh-movement must occur. However, because the wh-word is taking up the Spec-C position, it is not possible to move the competing wh-word higher by skipping the higher DP as wh-movement is a cyclic process.

=== Subject islands ===
Although wh-extraction out of object clauses and phrases is common in English, wh-movement is not (or rarely) possible out of subject phrases, particularly subject clauses. For example:

a. That John went home is likely.
b. *Who is that __ went home likely? Wh-extraction out of a subject clause fails

a. The story about Susan was funny.
b. ??Whom was the story about __ funny? Wh-extraction out of subject phrase is strongly marginal

=== Left branch islands ===
A left branch island occurs where a modifier precedes the noun that it modifies. The modifier cannot be extracted, a constraint which Ross identified as the Left Branch Condition. Possessive determiners and attributive adjectives form left branch islands. Fronting of these phrases necessitates pied-piping of the entire noun phrase, for example:

a. Susan likes Fred's account.
b. *Whose does Susan like __ account? – Attempt to extract from a left branch under a noun fails
c. Whose account does Susan like __? – Extraction succeeds if the entire noun phrase is pied-piped

a. He bought an expensive boat.
b. *How expensive did he buy a __ boat? – Attempt to extract from a left branch under a noun fails
c. How expensive a boat did he buy? – Extraction succeeds if the entire noun phrase is pied-piped

Extraction fails in the b. sentences because the extracted expression corresponds to a left-branch modifier of a noun.

While left branch islands exist in English, they are absent from many other languages, most notably from the Slavic languages.

=== Coordinate structure islands ===
In coordination, extraction out of a conjunct of a coordinate structure is possible only if this extraction affects all the conjuncts of the coordinate structure equally. The relevant constraint is known as the coordinate structure constraint. Extraction must extract the same syntactic expression out of each of the conjuncts simultaneously. This sort of extraction is said to occur across the board (ATB-extraction), e.g.,

a. Sam ate [beans] and [broccoli].
b. *What did Sam eat [beans] and [__]? – Extraction fails because it affects just one conjunct.

a. Sam ate [beans] and [broccoli].
b. *What did Sam eat [__] and [broccoli]? – Extraction fails because it affects just one conjunct.

a. Sam [gave a guitar to me] and [loaned a trumpet to you].
b. What did Sam [give __ to me] and [loan __ to you]? – Extraction succeeds because it occurs equally out of both conjuncts (ATB-extraction).

a. He is [waiting for you] and [trying to call you].
b. Whom is he [waiting for __] and [trying to call __]? – Extraction succeeds because it occurs equally out of both conjuncts (ATB-extraction).

Wh-extraction out of a conjunct of a coordinate structure is only possible if it can be interpreted as occurring equally out all the conjuncts simultaneously, that is, if it occurs across the board.

=== Complex noun phrase islands ===
Extraction from a noun phrase is difficult. The relevant constraint is known as the complex NP constraint, and comes in two varieties, the first banning extraction from the clausal complement of a noun, and the second banning extraction from a relative clause modifying a noun:

Sentential complement to a noun:

a. You heard the claim that Fred solved the second problem.
b. *What did you hear the claim that Fred solved __? – Attempt to extract out of a complex NP fails.

a. She likes the possibility that she might get a new phone for X-mas.
b. *What does she like the possibility that she might get __ for X-mas? – Attempt to extract out of a complex NP fails.

Relative clause:

a. They hired someone who speaks a Balkan language.
b. *What did they hire someone who speaks __?

=== Non-bridge-verb islands ===
Extraction out of object that-clauses serving as complements to verbs may show island-like behavior if the matrix verb is a nonbridge verb (Erteschik-Shir 1973). Nonbridge verbs include manner-of-speaking verbs, such as whisper or shout, e.g.,

a. She thinks that he died in his sleep.
b. How does she think that he died __? – Extraction out of object clause easily possible with matrix bridge verb.

a. She whispered that he had died in his sleep.
b. *How did she whisper that he had died __? – Extraction across a non-bridge verb is impossible.

== Wh-movement in syntax trees ==
Syntax trees are visual breakdowns of sentences that include dominating heads for every segment (word/constituent) in the tree itself. In the wh-movement, there are additional segments that are added: EPP (extended projection principle) and the question feature [+Q] that represents a question sentence.

The wh-movement is motivated by a question feature/EPP at C (complementizer), which promotes movement of a wh-word from the canonical base position to Spec-C. This movement could be considered as "copy + paste + delete" movement, as we are copying the interrogative word from the bottom, pasting it to Spec-C, and then deleting it from the bottom, so that it solely remains at the top (now taking the position of Spec-C). Overall, the highest C will be the target position of the wh-raising.

The interrogatives that are used in the wh-movement do not all share headedness. This is important to consider when making the syntax trees, as there are three different heads that may be used.

=== Headedness ===
Determiner phrase (DP): who, what

Prepositional phrase (PP): where, when, why

Adverb phrase (AdvP): how

When creating the syntax tree for the wh-movement, consider the subject-aux inversion in the word that was raised from T (tense) to C (complementizer).

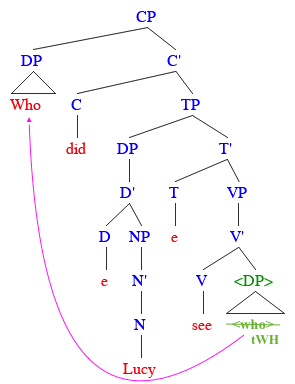

The location of the EPP (extended projection principle):

The EPP allows movement of the wh-word from the bottom canonical position of the syntax tree to Spec-C. The EPP is a great indicator when it comes to distinguishing between in-situ trees and ex-situ. Ex-situ trees allow the movement to Spec-C, while in-situ do not as the head C lacks the EPP feature.

=== Islands in syntax trees ===
Within syntax trees, islands do not allow movement to occur; if movement is attempted, the sentence would then be perceived as ungrammatical to the native speaker of the observed language. Islands are typically noted as being a boxed node on the tree. The movement in the wh-Island syntax tree is unable to occur because in order to move out of an embedded clause, a determiner phrase (DP) must move through the Spec-C position. This cannot occur, as the determiner phrase (DP) is already occupied.

For example, in "She said [who bought what]?", we see that "who" takes the place of DP and restricts "what" from rising up to the respected Spec-C. Native speakers may confirm this as well, as it will sound ungrammatical: * "What did she say [bought what?]".

== Multiple wh-questions ==
In languages, a sentence can contain more than one wh-question. These interrogative constructions are called multiple wh-questions,

e.g.: Who ate what at the restaurant?

In the following English example, a strikeout-line and trace-movement coindexation symbols—[Who_{i} ... ~~who~~ t_{i} ...]—are used to indicate the underlying raising-movement of the closest wh-phrase. This movement produces an overt sentence word order with one fronted wh-question:

e.g.: [Who_{i} did you help ~~who~~ t_{i} make what?]

- in the underlying (deep) syntax structure of this sentence, [who] is positioned directly after the transitive verb [help] because the VP selects a direct object DP as its complement
- the closest wh-phrase [who] is raised from its canonical position to Spec-CP, which produces sentence word order with a wh-question word at the beginning of the sentence
- the farther away wh-phrase [what ] is kept in-situ

In the underlying syntax, the wh-phrase closest to Spec-CP is raised to satisfy selectional properties of the CP: the [+Q] and [+Wh-EPP] feature requirements of C. The wh-phrase farther away from Spec-CP stays in its base position (in-situ).

=== Superiority condition ===
The superiority condition determines which wh-phrase moves in a clause that contains multiple wh-phrases. This is the outcome of applying the Attract Closest principle, where only the closest candidate is eligible for movement to the attracting head that selects for it. If the farther wh-phrase moves instead of the preceding wh-phrase, an ungrammatical structure is created (in English). Not all languages have instances of multiple wh-movement governed by the superiority condition, most have variations. There is no uniformity found across languages concerning the superiority condition.

For example, see the following English phrases:

a. [Who_{i} did you ask ~~who~~_{ti} to buy what?]
b. *[What_{i} did you ask who to buy ~~what~~_{ti}?]

The subscript "ti" or "i" are used to mark coreference. "t" represents a trace, while both "ti" and "i" represent that the words refer to each other and the same entity.

In a., the closer wh-phrase [who] moves up toward Spec-CP from being the subject of the VP [who to buy what]. The second wh-phrase [what] remains in-situ (as the direct object of the VP[who to buy what]). This is to satisfy the [+Q Wh] feature in the Spec-CP.

In b., the farther wh-phrase [what] has incorrectly moved from the direct object position of the VP[who to buy ~~what~~] into the Spec-CP position while the closer wh-phrase to Spec-CP [who] has remained in-situ as the subject of the VP[~~who~~ to buy what]. Thus, this sentence contains a violation of Attract Closest and is therefore ungrammatical, as marked by the asterisk (*).

== In other languages ==
Wh-movement is also found in many other languages around the world. Most European languages also place wh-words at the beginning of a clause. Furthermore, many of the facts illustrated above are also valid for other languages. The systematic difference in word order across main wh-clauses and subordinate wh-clauses shows up in other languages in varying forms. The islands to wh-extraction are also present in other languages, but there will be some variation. The following example illustrates wh-movement of an object in Spanish:

Juan compró carne.
John bought meat.
'John bought meat.'

¿Qué compró Juan?
what bought John
'What did John buy?'

The following examples illustrate wh-movement of an object in German:

Er liest Tesnière jeden Abend.
He reads Tesnière every evening.
'He reads Tesnière every evening.'

Wen liest er jeden Abend?
who reads he every evening
'Who does he read every evening?'

The following examples illustrate wh-movement of an object in French:

Ils ont vu Pierre.
they have seen Peter
'They saw Peter.'

Qui {est-ce qu'} ils ont vu?
Who {is it that} they have seen
'Who did they see?'

Qui ont ils vu?
Who have they seen
'Who did they see?'

All the examples are quite similar to the English examples and demonstrate that wh-movement is a general phenomenon in numerous languages. As stated, however, the behaviour of wh-movement can vary, depending on the individual language in question.

=== German ===
German does not show the expected effects of the superiority condition during clauses with multiple wh-phrases. German appears to have a process that allows the farther wh-phrase to "cross over" the closer wh-phrase and move, not remaining in-situ. This movement is tolerated and has less consequences than when compared with English.

For example, see the following German phrases:

Ich weiß nicht, wer was gesehen hat
I know not, who what seen has
"I do not know who saw what"

Ich weiß nicht, was wer gesehen hat
I know not, what who seen has
"I do not know what who has seen"

In a., the gloss shows that the wh-phrase [what] has "crossed over" wh-phrase [who] and is now in Spec-CP to satisfy the [+Q Wh] feature. This movement is a violation of the attract closest principle, which is what the superiority condition is based upon.

=== Mandarin Chinese ===
Mandarin is a wh-in-situ language, which means that it does not exhibit wh-movement in constituent questions. In other words, wh-words in Mandarin remain in their original position in their clause, contrasting with wh-movement in English where the wh-word would move in constituent questions.

==== In-situ ====
The following example illustrates multiple wh-movement in Mandarin:

你 想 知道 瑪麗 為什麼 買了 什麼
nǐ xiǎng zhīdǎo Mǎlì wèishénme mǎile shénme
You want know Mary why buy-PAST what
'What do you wonder why Mary bought it?'

This example demonstrates that the wh-word "what" in Mandarin remains in-situ at Surface structure, while the wh-word "why" in Mandarin moves to proper scope position and, in doing so, c-commands the wh-word that stays in-situ.

==== Matrix scope ====
The scope of wh-questions in Mandarin is also subject to other conditions depending on the kind of wh-phrase involved. The following example can translate into two meanings:

你 想 知道 誰 買了 什麼
nǐ xiǎng zhīdǎo shéi mǎile shénme
You want know who buy-PAST what
'What is the thing x such that you wonder who bought x?'
'Who is the person x such that you wonder what x bought?'

This example illustrates the way certain wh-words such as "who" and "what" can freely obtain matrix scope in Mandarin.

==== Attract Closest ====
In reference to the Attract Closest principle, where the head adopts the closest candidate available to it, the overt wh-phrase in Mandarin moves to proper scope position while the other wh-phrase stays in-situ as it is c-commanded by the wh-phrase first mentioned. This can be seen in the following example, where the word for "what" stays in-situ since it is c-commanded by the phrase in Mandarin meaning "at where":

你 想 知道 瑪麗 在 哪裡 買了 什麼
nǐ xiǎng zhīdǎo Mǎlì zài nǎlǐ mǎile shénme
You want know Mary at where buy-PAST what
'What is the thing x such that you wonder where Mary bought x?'
'Where is the place x such that you wonder what Mary bought at x?'

As these examples show, Mandarin is a wh-in-situ language, exhibits no movement of wh-phrases at Surface structure, is subject to other conditions based on the type of wh-phrase involved in the question, and adheres to the Attract Closest principle.

=== Bulgarian ===
ln Bulgarian, the [+ wh] feature of C motivates multiple wh-word movements, which leads to multiple specifiers. It requires formation of clusters of wh-phrases in [Spec-CP] in the matrix clause. This is different from English because in English, only one wh-word moves to [Spec-CP] when there are multiple wh-words in a clause. This is because, in Bulgarian, unlike English, all movements of wh-elements take place in the syntax, where movement is shown overtly. The phrase structure for wh-words in Bulgarian would look like is shown in Figure 1 below, where a wh-cluster is formed under [Spec-CP].

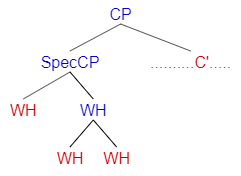
Figure 1. Phrase structure of multiple wh-movement in Bulgarian

In Bulgarian and Romanian, a wh-element is attracted into [Spec-CP] and the other wh-elements are adjoined into the first wh-word in [Spec-CP].

Koj kogo ___t_{1} vižda ___t_{2}?
Who whom {} sees {}
Who sees whom?

In Example 1, we see that both the wh-words underwent movement and are in a [Spec-CP] cluster.

==== Attract Closest ====
The Attract Closest is a principle of the Superiority Condition where the head which attracts a certain feature adopts the closest candidate available to it. This usually leads to the movement of the closest candidate.

Slavic languages are grouped into two different S-structures concerning the movement of wh-elements at [Spec-CP] (Rudin, 1998). One group includes the languages Serbo-Croatian, Polish, and Czech where there is only one wh-element in [Spec-CP] at S-structure. The other group contains Bulgarian, which has all of its wh-elements in [Spec-CP] at S-structure. In the first group mentioned, the Attract Closest principle is present, and the wh-word that is closest to the attracting head undergoes movement while the rest of the wh-elements remain in-situ. The second group of languages, the Attract Closest principle occurs in a slightly different way. The order of the way the wh-word moves is dictated by their proximity to [Spec-CP]. The closest wh-word to the attracting head undergoes movement first and the next closest one follows suit, and on and on. In that way, the Superiority effect is present in Serbo-Croatian, Polish, and Czech in the first wh-element, while, in Bulgarian, it is present in all of the wh-elements in the clause.

Kakvo kak napravi Ivan?
What how did Ivan?
How did Ivan what?

The Attract Closest principle explains a crucial detail about which wh-words move first in the tree. Since the closest wh-word is moved first, there is a particular order that appears. Wh-subjects go before wh-objects and wh-adjuncts (Grewendorf, 2001). This is seen in Example #2 and Example #3. Example #3 also shows that there can be more than two wh-words in [Spec-CP] and that, no matter how many wh-words are in the clause, they would all have to undergo movement.

Koj kak kogo e celunal?
Who how whom is kissed
Who kissed whom how?

==== In-situ ====
In Bulgarian, we see in Example #4 that to defer from forming a sequence of the same wh-words, a wh-element is allowed to remain in-situ as a last resort (Bošković, 2002).

Kakvo obuslavja kakvo?
What conditions what
What conditions what?

In summary, Bulgarian has multiple wh-movement in the syntax and the wh-words move overtly. We also see that while all wh-words in a clause move under [Spec-CP] because of the [+ wh] feature, there is still a certain order in how they appear in the clause.

=== French ===
In French, multiple wh-questions have the following patterns:

a) In some French interrogative sentences, wh-movement can be optional.

1.The closest wh-phrase to Spec-CP can be fronted (i.e., moved to Spec-CP from its covert base position in deep structure to its overt phonological form in surface-structure word order);

2. Alternatively, wh-phrases can remain in-situ.

Qu' as- tu envoyé à qui?
what have you sent to whom

Tu as envoyé quoi à qui?
you have sent what to whom
'What have you sent to who(m)?'

In the example sentences above, examples #1 and #2 are both grammatical and share the same meaning in French. Here, the choice of using one form of question over the other is optional; either sentence can be used to ask about the two particular DP constituents expressed by two wh-words. In French, the second sentence could also be used as an echo question. By contrast, in English, the grammatical structure of the second sentence is only acceptable as an echo question: a question we ask to clarify the information we hear (or mishear) in someone's utterance, or that we use to express our shock or disbelief in reaction to a statement made by someone. For echo questions in English, it is typical for speakers to emphasize the wh-words prosodically by using rising intonation (e.g.,You sent WHAT to WHO?). These special instances of using multiple wh-questions in English are essentially "requests for the repetition of that utterance".

b) In other French interrogative sentences, wh-movement is required.

The option of using wh-in-situ in French sentences with multiple wh-questions is limited to specific conditions. There exists "a very limited distribution" of its usage.

French wh-in-situ can occur only:

1. in matrix clauses (aka main clauses)
2. in matrix clauses that do not have an overt complementizer (i.e., complementizer is 'phonologically null')
3. in 'short-distance' questions (i.e., wh-movement not blocked by a wh-island constraint)

Wh-in-situ usage is not allowed in French when these criteria are not met.

=== Languages in which it is not present ===
Many languages do not have wh-movement. Instead, these languages keep the symmetry of the question and answer sentences.

For example, topic questions in Chinese have the same sentence structure as their answers:

你 在 做 什麼？
nǐ zài zuò shénme
you PROG do what
What are you doing?

The response to which could be:

我 在 編輯 維基百科。
wǒ zài biānjí {Wéi jī bǎi kē}
I PROG edit Wikipedia
I am editing Wikipedia.

Chinese has a wh-particle, no wh-movement.

== Theoretical approaches ==
Wh-movement typically results in a discontinuity: the "moved" constituent ends up in a position that is separated from its canonical position by material that syntactically dominates the canonical position, which means there seems to be a discontinuous constituent and a long distance dependency present. Such discontinuities challenge any theory of syntax, and any theory of syntax is going to have a component that can address these discontinuities. In this regard, theories of syntax tend to explain discontinuities in one of two ways, either via movement or via feature passing. The EPP feature (extended projection principle) and Question Feature play a large role in the movement itself. We have noticed that these two features occur in ex-situ questions which allow movement and do not exist in in-situ questions that do allow it.

Theories that posit movement have a long and established tradition that reaches back to early Generative Grammar (1960s and 1970s). They assume that the displaced constituent (e.g., the wh-expression) is first generated in its canonical position at some level or point in the structure generating process below the surface. This expression is then moved or copied out of this base position and placed in its surface position where it actually appears in speech. Movement is indicated in tree structures using one of a variety of means (e.g., a trace t, movement arrows, strikeouts, lighter font shade, etc.).

The alternative to the movement approach to wh-movement and discontinuities in general is feature passing. This approach rejects the notion that movement in any sense has occurred. The wh-expression is base generated in its surface position, and instead of movement, information passing (i.e., feature passing) occurs up or down the syntactic hierarchy to and from the position of the gap.

== See also ==
- Dependency grammar
- Discontinuity
- Extraposition
- Phrase structure grammar
- Scrambling
- Topicalization
- V2 word order
