= Shifting (syntax) =

Syntactic process affecting where constituents appear

In syntax, shifting occurs when two or more constituents appearing on the same side of their common head exchange positions in a sense to obtain non-canonical order. The most widely acknowledged type of shifting is heavy NP shift, but shifting involving a heavy NP is just one manifestation of the shifting mechanism. Shifting occurs in most if not all European languages, and it may in fact be possible in all natural languages, including sign languages. Shifting is not inversion, and inversion is not shifting, but the two mechanisms are similar insofar as they are both present in languages like English that have relatively strict word order. The theoretical analysis of shifting varies in part depending on the theory of sentence structure that one adopts. If one assumes relatively flat structures, shifting does not result in a discontinuity. Shifting is often motivated by the relative weight of the constituents involved. The weight of a constituent is determined by a number of factors: e.g., number of words, contrastive focus, and semantic content.

== Basic examples ==
Shifting is illustrated with the following pairs of sentences. The first sentence of each pair shows what can be considered canonical order, whereas the second gives an alternative order that results from shifting:

I gave the books which my uncle left to me as part of his inheritance to her.
I gave to her the books which my uncle left to me as part of his inheritance.

The first sentence with canonical order, where the object noun phrase (NP) precedes the oblique prepositional phrase (PP), is marginal due to the relative "heaviness" of the NP compared to the PP. The second sentence, which shows shifting, is better because it has the lighter PP preceding the much heavier NP. The following examples illustrate shifting with particle verbs:

He picked it up. (compare: *He picked up it.)
He picked up the flashlight.

John took him on. (compare: *John took on him.)
John took on the new player.

When the object of the particle verb is a pronoun, the pronoun must precede the particle, whereas when the object is an NP, the particle can precede the NP. Each of the two constituents involved is said to shift, whereby this shifting is motivated by the weight of the two relative to each other. In English verb phrases, heavier constituents tend to follow lighter constituents. The following examples illustrate shifting using pronouns, clauses, and PPs:

She said that to her friends.
She said to her friends that she had solved the problem.

They hid that from me.
They hid from me that I was going to pass the course.

When the pronoun appears, it is much lighter than the PP, so it precedes the PP. But if the full clause appears, it is heavier than the PP and can therefore follow it.

== Further examples ==
The syntactic category of the constituents involved in shifting is not limited; they can even be of the same type, e.g.

It happened on Tuesday due to the weather.
It happened due to the weather on Tuesday.

Sam considers him a cheater.
Sam considers a cheater anyone who used Wikipedia.

In the first pair, the shifted constituents are PPs, and in the second pair, the shifted constituents are NPs. The second pair illustrates again that shifting is often motivated by the relative weight of the constituents involved; the NP anyone who used Wikipedia is heavier than the NP a cheater.

The examples so far have shifting occurring in verb phrases. Shifting is not restricted to verb phrases. It can also occur, for instance, in NPs:

the book on the shelf about linguistics
the book about linguistics on the second shelf down from top

the picture of him that I found
the picture that I found of that old friend of mine with funny hair

These examples again illustrate shifting that is motivated by the relative weight of the constituents involved. The heavier of the two constituents prefers to appear further to the right.

The example sentences above all have the shifted constituents appearing after their head (see below). Constituents that precede their head can also shift, e.g.

Probably Susan left.
Susan probably left.

Certainly that happened more than once.
That certainly happened more than once.

Since the finite verb is viewed as the head of the clause in each case, these data allow an analysis in terms of shifting. The subject and modal adverb have swapped positions. In other languages that have many head-final structures, shifting in the pre-head domain is a common occurrence.

== Theoretical analyses ==
If one assumes relatively flat structures, the analysis of many canonical instances of shifting is straightforward. Shifting occurs among two or more sister constituents that appear on the same side of their head. The following trees illustrate the basic shifting constellation in a phrase structure grammar (= constituency grammar) first and in a dependency grammar second:

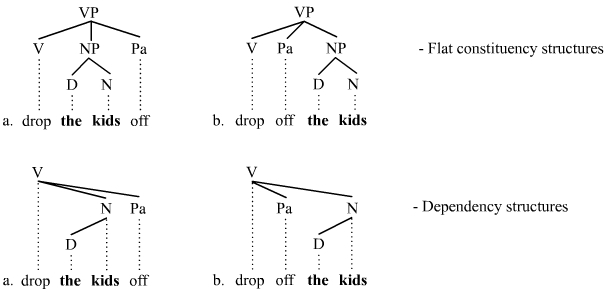

The two constituency-based trees show a flat VP that allows n-ary branching (as opposed to just binary branching). The two dependency-based trees show the same VP. Regardless of whether one chooses the constituency- or the dependency-based analysis, the important thing about these examples is the relative flatness of the structure. This flatness results in a situation where shifting does not necessitate a discontinuity (i.e. no long distance dependency), for there can be no crossing lines in the trees. The following trees further illustrate the point:

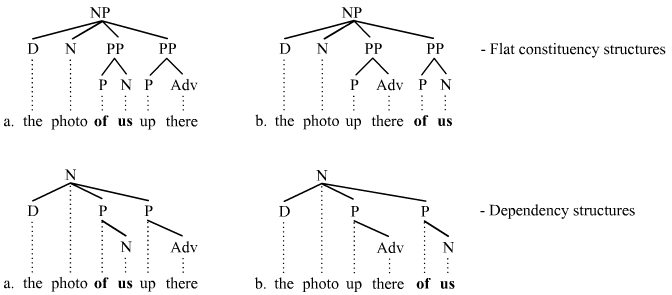

Again due to the flatness of structure, shifting does not result in a discontinuity. In this example, both orders are acceptable because there is little difference in the relative weight between the two constituents that switch positions.

An alternative analysis of shifting is necessary in a constituency grammar that posits strictly binary branching structures. The more layered binary branching structures would result in crossing lines in the tree, which means movement (or copying) is necessary to avoid these crossing lines. The following trees are (merely) representative of the type of analysis that one might assume given strictly binary branching structures:

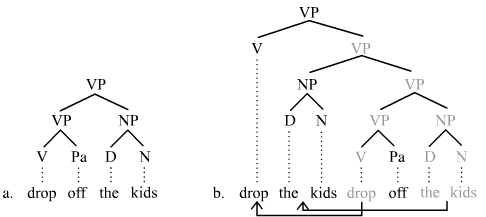

The analysis shown with the trees assumes binary branching and leftward movement only. Given these restrictions, two instances of movement might be necessary to accommodate the surface order seen in tree b. The material in light gray represents copies that must be deleted in the phonological component.

This sort of analysis of shifting has been criticized by Ray Jackendoff, among others. Jackendoff and Culicover argue for an analysis like that shown with the flatter trees above, whereby heavy NP shift does not result from movement, but rather from a degree of optionality in the ordering of a verb's complements. The preferred order in English is for the direct object to follow the indirect object in a double-object construction, and for adjuncts to follow objects of all kinds; but if the direct object is "heavy", the opposite order may be preferred (since this leads to a more right-branching tree structure which is easier to process).

== A mystery ==
From a generativist's perspective, a mysterious property of shifting is that in the case of ditransitive verbs, a shifted direct object prevents extraction of the indirect object via wh-movement:

Whom did you give the books written by the venerable Professor Plum to?
*Whom did you give to the books written by the venerable Professor Plum?

Some generativists use this example to argue against the hypothesis that shifting merely results from choice between alternative complement orders, a hypothesis that does not imply movement. Their analysis in terms of a strictly binary branching tree resulting from leftward movements would in turn be able to explain this restriction. However, there are at least two ways of countering this argument: 1) in case one wants to explain choice, if choice is assumed to be performed between possible orders, the impossible order is not in the linguistic potential and it cannot be chosen; however, 2) in case one wants to explain generation, that is, to explain how a linguistic potential comes to exist in a situation, one can explain this phenomenon in terms of generation and avoidance rules: for instance, one of the reasons for avoiding a wording in potentiality would be an ordering in which a preposition falls before a nominal group by accident as in the example above. In other words, from a functional perspective, we either recognise that these fake clauses are none of the clauses we can choose from (choice of possible clauses) or we say that they are generated and avoided because they might cause listeners to misunderstand what the speaker is saying (generation and avoidance).
