= Inversion (linguistics) =

Grammatical construction

In linguistics, inversion is any of several grammatical constructions where two expressions switch their typical or expected order of appearance, that is, they invert. There are several types of subject-verb inversion in English: locative inversion, directive inversion, copular inversion, and quotative inversion. The most frequent type of inversion in English is subject–auxiliary inversion in which an auxiliary verb changes places with its subject; it often occurs in questions, such as Are you coming?, with the subject you being switched with the auxiliary are. In many other languages, especially those with a freer word order than that of English, inversion can take place with a variety of verbs (not just auxiliaries) and with other syntactic categories as well.

When a layered constituency-based analysis of sentence structure is used, inversion often results in the discontinuity of a constituent, but that would not be the case with a flatter dependency-based analysis. In that regard, inversion has consequences similar to those of shifting.

== In Germanic languages ==
A characteristic of Germanic languages, except modern English, which still has remnants of this principle, is that non-question sentences, including clauses that aren't themselves questions, have a V2 word order, meaning that the finite verb is the second syntactic constituent in the sentence or clause. This is observed as a subject-verb inversion whenever a preceding constituent displaces the subject from its regular position first in the sentence. However, an unprovoked subject-verb inversion, or what may be described as V1 word order, makes the sentence a question. As a special case, the question phrase can become a non-question if used as a condition, such as "Had I known …". The position of non-finite verbs, which differ between North and West Germanic languages, and English uses more of, do not take part in determining whether the sentence is a question. Neither do question words.

Syntax highlighting: In the following table, finite verbs are in red, non-finite verbs are in orange and subjects are blue. Whenever the subject and verb changes places (the inversion occurs), they are italicized. Words that cause the inversion are in green, whereas words that don't are in grey.

Examples and circumstances of subject-verb inversions common to the Germanic language family (that English has remnants of)
Verb position	Word order (BNF)	is a question	Example		English word for word translation	Modern English
V2	Subject Verb	No	Norwegian	jeg er	I am	
V2	Subject Verb	No	German	ich bin	I am	
V2	Independent-clause Question-word Subject Verb	N/A	Norwegian	… hvor jeg er	… where I am	
V2	Independent-clause Question-word Subject Verb	N/A	German	… wo ich bin	… where I am	
V2	Adverb Verb Subject	No	Norwegian	derfor er jeg	therefore am I	therefore, I am
V2	Adverb Verb Subject	No	German	deshalb bin ich	therefore am I	therefore, I am
V2	Adverb Verb Subject	No	Norwegian	aldri har jeg	never have I	
V2	Adverb Verb Subject	No	German	noch nie habe ich	never have I	
V2	Adverb Verb Subject	No	Norwegian	nå snør det	now snows it	now, it is snowing
V2	Adverb Verb Subject	No	German	jetzt schneit es	now snows it	now, it is snowing
V2	Preposition Verb Subject	No	Norwegian	her er jeg	here am I	here, I am
V2	Preposition Verb Subject	No	German	hier bin ich	here am I	here, I am
V2	Preposition Verb Subject	No	Norwegian	her kommer sola	here comes the sun	
V2	Preposition Verb Subject	No	German	hier kommt die Sonne	here comes the sun	
V2	Object Verb Subject	No	Icelandic	það veit ég	that know I	that, I know
V2	Object Verb Subject	No	Norwegian	det vet jeg	that know I	that, I know
V2	Object Verb Subject	No	Dutch	dat weet ik	that know I	that, I know
V2	Object Verb Subject	No	German	das weiß ich	that know I	that, I know
V1	Verb Subject	Yes	Norwegian	er jeg	am I	
V1	Verb Subject	Yes	German	bin ich	am I	
V1	Question-word Verb Subject	Yes	Norwegian	hvor er jeg	where am I	
V1	Question-word Verb Subject	Yes	German	wo bin ich	where am I	
V1	Verb Subject Question-word Subject Verb	Yes	Norwegian	vet du hvor jeg er	know you where I am	do you know where I am
V1	Verb Subject Question-word Subject Verb	Yes	German	weißt du, wo ich bin	know you where I am	do you know where I am
V1	Verb Subject Verb Object Verb Subject Verb Verb Object	No	Norwegian	hadde jeg visst det, ville jeg ha sagt det	had I known it, would I have said it	had I known it, I would have said it

== In English ==
English uses subject-verb inversions less often than other Germanic languages. Broadly, a distinction can be made between auxiliary and full verbs. The auxiliary verbs undergo inversion in more cases than other verbs.

=== Subject–auxiliary inversion ===
a. Fred will stay.
b. Will Fred stay? - Subject–auxiliary inversion with yes/no question

a. Larry has done it.
b. What has Larry done? - Subject–auxiliary inversion with constituent question

a. Fred has helped at no point.
b. At no point has Fred helped. - Subject–auxiliary inversion with fronted expression containing negation (negative inversion)

a. If we were to surrender, ...
b. Were we to surrender, ... - Subject–auxiliary inversion in condition clause

The default order in English is subject–verb (SV), but a number of meaning-related differences (such as those illustrated above) motivate the subject and auxiliary verb to invert so that the finite verb precedes the subject; one ends up with auxiliary–subject (Aux-S) order. That type of inversion fails if the finite verb is not an auxiliary:

a. Fred stayed.
b. *Stayed Fred? - Inversion impossible here because the verb is NOT an auxiliary verb

(The star * is the symbol used in linguistics to indicate that the example is grammatically unacceptable.)

=== Non-auxiliary subject–verb inversion ===
In languages like Italian, Spanish, Finnish, etc. subject-verb inversion is commonly seen with a wide range of verbs and does not require an element at the beginning of the sentence. See the following Italian example:

è arrivato Giovanni.
is arrived Giovanni
'Giovanni arrived'

In English, on the other hand, subject-verb inversion generally takes the form of a Locative inversion. A familiar example of subject-verb inversion from English is the presentational there construction.

There's a shark.

English (especially written English) also has an inversion construction involving a locative expression other than there ("in a little white house" in the following example):

In a little white house lived two rabbits.

Contrary to the subject-auxiliary inversion, the verb in cases of subject–verb inversion in English is not required to be an auxiliary verb; it is, rather, a full verb or a form of the copula be. If the sentence has an auxiliary verb, the subject is placed after the auxiliary and the main verb. For example:

a. A unicorn will come into the room.
b. Into the room will come a unicorn.

Since this type of inversion generally places the focus on the subject, the subject is likely to be a full noun or noun phrase rather than a pronoun. Third-person personal pronouns are especially unlikely to be found as the subject in this construction:

a. Down the stairs came the dog. - Noun subject
b. Down the stairs came it. - Third-person personal pronoun as subject; unlikely unless it has special significance and is stressed
c. Down the stairs came I. - First-person personal pronoun as subject; more likely, though still I would require stress

== In other languages ==
Certain other languages, like other Germanic languages and Romance languages, use inversion in ways broadly similar to English, such as in question formation. The restriction of inversion to auxiliary verbs does not generally apply in those languages; subjects can be inverted with any type of verb, but particular languages have their own rules and restrictions.

For example, French can form questions using verb-subject inversions like a Germanic language: tu aimes le chocolat is a declarative sentence meaning "you like the chocolate". When the order of the subject tu ("you") and the verb aimes ("like") is switched, a question is produced: aimes-tu le chocolat? ("do you like the chocolate?"). Compare with Norwegian: du liker means "you like", whereas liker du would mean "do you like". Note that English obeys the same rule despite its use of the auxiliary word "do": It is the position of the finite verb that determines whether the sentence is a question, and the auxiliary verb takes that place.

In languages with free word order, inversion of subject and verb or of other elements of a clause can occur more freely, often for pragmatic reasons rather than as part of a specific grammatical construction.

=== Locative inversion ===
Locative inversion is a common linguistic phenomenon that has been studied by linguists of various theoretical backgrounds.

In multiple Bantu languages, such as Chichewa, the locative and subject arguments of certain verbs can be inverted without changing the semantic roles of those arguments, similar to the English subject-verb inversion examples above. Below are examples from Zulu, where the numbers indicate noun classes, SBJ = subject agreement prefix, APPL = applicative suffix, FV = final vowel in Bantu verbal morphology, and LOC is the locative circumfix for adjuncts.

- Canonical word order:

A-bantwana ba-fund-el-a e-sikole-ni.
2-2.child 2.SBJ-study-APPL-FV LOC:7-7.school-LOC
"The children study at the school."

- Locative inversion:

I-sikole si-fund-el-a a-bantwana.
7-7.school 7.SBJ-study-APPL-FV 2-2.child
"The children study at the school." (lit. "The school studies the children.")

In the locative inversion example, isikole, "school" acts as the subject of the sentence while semantically remaining a locative argument rather than a subject/agent one. Moreover, we can see that it is able to trigger subject-verb agreement as well, further indicating that it is the syntactic subject of the sentence.

This is in contrast to examples of locative inversion in English, where the semantic subject of the sentence controls subject-verb agreement, implying that it is a dislocated syntactic subject as well:

1. Down the hill rolls the car.
2. Down the hill roll the cars.

In the English examples, the verb roll agrees in number with cars, implying that the latter is still the syntactic subject of the sentence, despite being in a noncanonical subject position. However, in the Zulu example of locative inversion, it is the noun isikole, "school" that controls subject-verb agreement, despite not being the semantic subject of the sentence.

Locative inversion is observed in Mandarin Chinese. Consider the following sentences:

- Canonical word order

Gǎngshào zhàn zài ménkǒu.
Sentry stand at door
'At the entrance stands a/the sentry'

- Locative inversion

Ménkǒu zhàn-zhe gǎngshào.
Door stand-DUR sentry
'At the entrance stands a/the sentry'

In canonical word order, the subject (gǎngshào 'sentry') appears before the verb and the locative expression (ménkǒu 'door') after the verb. In Locative inversion, the two expressions switch the order of appearance: it is the locative that appears before the verb while the subject occurs in postverbal position. In Chinese, as in many other languages, the inverted word order carry a presentational function, that is, it is used to introduce new entities into discourse.

== Theoretical analyses ==
Syntactic inversion has played an important role in the history of linguistic theory because of the way it interacts with question formation and topic and focus constructions. The particular analysis of inversion can vary greatly depending on the theory of syntax that one pursues. One prominent type of analysis is in terms of movement in transformational phrase structure grammars. Since those grammars tend to assume layered structures that acknowledge a finite verb phrase (VP) constituent, they need movement to overcome what would otherwise be a discontinuity. In dependency grammars, by contrast, sentence structure is less layered (in part because a finite VP constituent is absent), which means that simple cases of inversion do not involve a discontinuity; the dependent simply appears on the other side of its head. The two competing analyses are illustrated with the following trees:

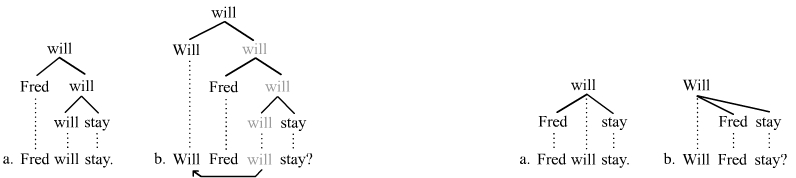

The two trees on the left illustrate the movement analysis of subject-auxiliary inversion in a constituency-based theory; a BPS-style (bare phrase structure) representational format is employed, where the words themselves are used as labels for the nodes in the tree. The finite verb will is seen moving out of its base position into a derived position at the front of the clause. The trees on the right show the contrasting dependency-based analysis. The flatter structure, which lacks a finite VP constituent, does not require an analysis in terms of movement but the dependent Fred simply appears on the other side of its head Will.

Pragmatic analyses of inversion generally emphasize the information status of the two noncanonically positioned phrases – that is, the degree to which the switched phrases constitute given or familiar information vs. new or informative information. Birner (1996), for example, draws on a corpus study of naturally occurring inversions to show that the initial preposed constituent must be at least as familiar within the discourse (in the sense of Prince 1992) as the final postposed constituent – which in turn suggests that inversion serves to help the speaker maintain a given-before-new ordering of information within the sentence. In later work, Birner (2018) argues that passivization and inversion are variants, or alloforms, of a single argument-reversing construction that, in turn, serves in a given instance as either a variant of a more general preposing construction or a more general postposing construction.

The overriding function of inverted sentences (including locative inversion) is presentational: the construction is typically used either to introduce a discourse-new referent or to introduce an event which in turn involves a referent which is discourse-new. The entity thus introduced will serve as the topic of the subsequent discourse. Consider the following spoken Chinese example:

Zhènghǎo tóuli guò-lai yí lǎotóur,
Just ahead pass-come one-CL old-man
'Right then came over an old man.'

zhè lǎotóur, tā zhàn-zhe hái bù dònghuó
this old.man 3S stand-DUR still not move
'this old man, he was standing without moving.'

The constituent yí lǎotóur "an old man" is introduced for the first time into discourse in post-verbal position. Once it is introduced by the presentational inverted structure, it can be coded by the proximal demonstrative pronoun zhè 'this' and then by the personal pronoun tā – denoting an accessible referent: a referent that is already present in speakers' consciousness.

== See also ==
- Constituent (linguistics)
- Dependency grammar
- Finite verb
- Head (linguistics)
- Hyperbaton
- Phrase structure grammar
- Verb phrase
