= Discontinuity (linguistics) =

Syntactic separation from a modifying element

In linguistics, a discontinuity occurs when a given word or phrase is separated from another word or phrase that it modifies in such a manner that a direct connection cannot be established between the two without incurring crossing lines in the tree structure. The terminology that is employed to denote discontinuities varies depending on the theory of syntax at hand. The terms discontinuous constituent, displacement, long distance dependency, unbounded dependency, and projectivity violation are largely synonymous with the term discontinuity. There are various types of discontinuities, the most prominent and widely studied of these being topicalization, wh-fronting, scrambling, and extraposition.

Natural languages vary with respect to the types of discontinuities that they permit. The fixed word order of English allows for relatively few discontinuities compared to, for instance, the Slavic languages, which are much more permissive. Even compared to a closely related language such as German, English is rigid, allowing few discontinuities.

== Projectivity ==
Projectivity is a principle of tree structures by which discontinuities are identified and defined. A tree structure is said to be projective if there are no crossing dependency edges and/or projection lines. If there are crossing edges/lines however, then the structure is non-projective and contains one or more projectivity violations. The concept and terminology of projectivity is associated most with the structures of dependency grammar, although the concept is just as applicable to the structures of phrase structure grammars (= constituency grammars). The discussion here considers projectivity first in terms of dependency-based structures and then in terms of constituency-based structures.

The flatter the tree structures are, the fewer projectivity violations they will contain. As structures become more layered, the number of projectivity violations can increase.

=== Dependency-based projectivity ===
The following trees illustrate projective and non-projective structures in a dependency-based analysis of sentence structure:

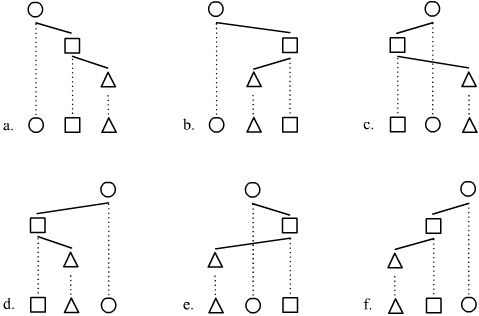

The trees show all six possible three-level structures conceivable for the three element hierarchy circle-square-triangle. Four of these six trees are projective because they contain no crossing lines. Trees (c) and (e), however, are not projective due to the crossing lines; each of (c) and (e) contains a projectivity violation because a solid dependency edge crosses a dotted projection line. In other words, each of (c) and (e) contains a discontinuity. The trees illustrate when discontinuities occur: if a given constituent (= complete subtree) is separated from its head by an element that dominates its head, a discontinuity is obtained.

Dependency grammars have explored the projectivity principle in great detail and have formalized it rigorously. The concept is, however, a simple one. If crossing lines are obtained in the tree, projectivity has been violated, meaning a discontinuity is present.

=== Constituency-based projectivity ===
The terminology that constituency grammars (= phrase structure grammars) employ to identify and define discontinuities is different. The projectivity principle certainly exists, although it is acknowledged in terms of discontinuous constituents, long distance dependencies, and/or unbounded dependencies. The constituency-based versions of the six hierarchies from the previous section are rendered as follows. The solid shapes represent phrasal categories, and the empty shapes lexical categories:

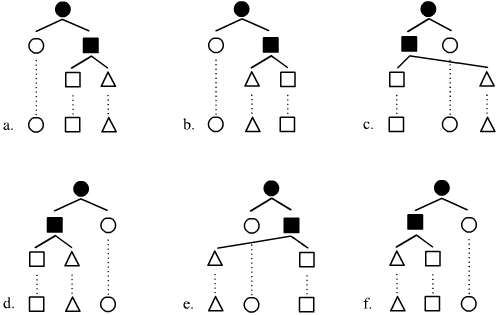

The crossing lines again identify projectivity violations. Hence trees (c) and (e) here contain discontinuities, just as they do further above. The solid square constituents in tree (c) and tree (e) are discontinuous in a manner similar to that of the empty square constituents in the dependency-based trees (c) and (e) above.

== Types ==
Discontinuities occur in most if not all natural languages. But the types of discontinuities that a given language allows may differ from the discontinuities of another language, even if the languages are closely related. Worth noting is that a large majority of sentences in most languages are projective, i.e. they do not contain discontinuities. Only about 15–25% of actual sentences contain a discontinuity, and the percentage of discontinuous dependencies is even much less, approximately 1–2%.

The following discussion briefly considers four widely acknowledged types of discontinuities: 1) topicalization, 2) wh-fronting, 3) scrambling, and 4) extraposition. English allows three of the four; it does not allow scrambling. Examples from German are therefore used to illustrate scrambling discontinuities.

=== Topicalization ===
Topicalization occurs when a constituent is fronted in order to establish it as the topic. The topicalization of argument NPs is rare in English, but adjunct prepositional phrases (PPs) that establish situational context are frequently topicalized. Topicalization is illustrated here (and further below) using both a constituency- and a dependency-based tree, the constituency-based tree on the left and the dependency-based tree on the right. The convention is employed throughout whereby the words themselves are used to label the nodes in the trees:

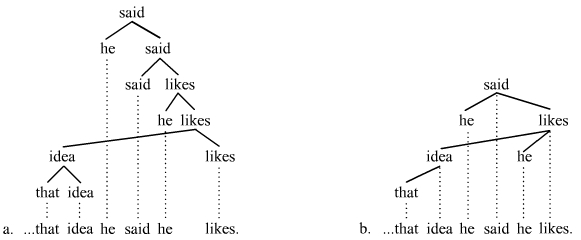

The crossing lines are clearly visible in these trees. Further examples of topicalization discontinuities (but without the trees):

Due to the weather, we are sure that they left.
After school, Connor has been practicing piano.
To his wife, Jim gave a fantastic present.

The material in italics has been topicalized, which results in a discontinuity each time.

=== Wh-fronting ===
Wh-fronting (= wh-movement) occurs when a wh-expression appears at the front of the clause in order to focus it. Wh-fronting occurs in direct and indirect questions with interrogative words (e.g. how, what, when, where, which, who, why, etc.) and in relative clauses with relative pro-forms (that, what, where, which, when, who, whose, etc.). The constituency-based tree appears again on the left, and the dependency-based tree on the right:

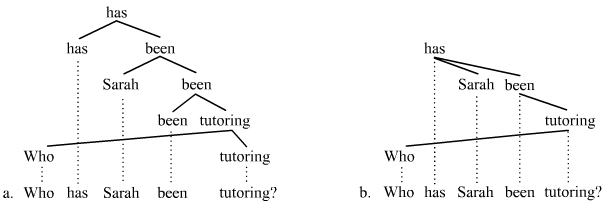

These trees are (merely) representative of the type of analyses that one encounters in various grammars. Especially the constituency-based tree here may be disputed. Nevertheless, the crossing lines are again clearly visible. Further examples of wh-fronting discontinuities in matrix and embedded clauses:

Which house does Jim plan to buy?
Why has that been annoying you?
Nobody knows what they have been saying.

the person who we have been seeking
dangers which you have been ignoring
a politician whose flip-flops nobody is willing to forget

The material in italics has been wh-fronted. The first three examples show wh-fronting in direct or indirect interrogative clauses, and the second three illustrate wh-fronting in relative clauses.

=== Scrambling ===
Scrambling can result in a discontinuity (although it need not; sometimes scrambling is accomplished by shifting alone). Scrambling discontinuities often occur in order to accommodate the informational content of constituents, old information preferring to precede new information. Scrambling is frequently visible in the leftward striving of definite pronouns. Scrambling discontinuities are absent from English, but they are very common in languages with freer word order such as German. The following trees illustrate a scrambling discontinuity in a subordinate clause of German:

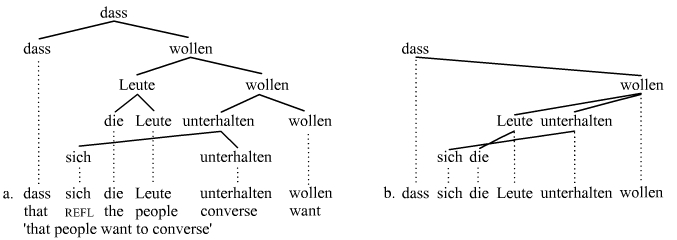

The crossing lines identifying the discontinuity are again completely visible. The reflexive pronoun sich strives leftward, which results in the discontinuity. Discontinuities of this sort occur frequently in German. The italicized expressions in the following examples are separated from their heads in such a manner that scrambling discontinuities obtain:

Natürlich kann uns nichts überraschen. (naturally can us nothing surprise; 'Naturally nothing can surprise us.')
Sie haben den versucht zu lesen. (they have it tried to read; 'They tried to read it.')
dass ihn viele Leute bewundert haben (that him many people admired have; 'That many people have admired him.')
Essen werde ich das nicht. (eat shall I that not; 'I shall not eat that.')

In each of these examples, the italicized constituent is displaced, resulting in a discontinuity. An important aspect of scrambling is that it can operate in both directions. The displaced unit can both precede its head as in the first three examples and follow it as in the fourth example.

=== Extraposition ===
Extraposition occurs when an expression appears further to the right of where it would appear under other (but similar) circumstances. It is motivated by the desire to focus or emphasize the extraposed expression, or it serves to reduce center embedding and in doing so, it increases right-branching, right-branching structures being easier to process in English than left-branching structures:

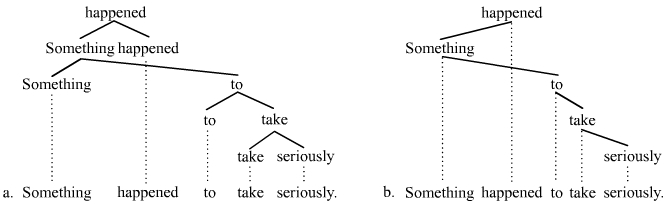

The crossing lines identifying the discontinuity are again easily visible. In canonical cases, extraposition is optional, e.g.

Something that was unexpected then occurred.
Something then occurred that was unexpected.

Did anyone who you expected to help actually help?
Did anyone actually help who you expected to help?

They called someone to pick up the kids before school.
They called someone before school to pick up the kids.

One can also distinguish between two types of extraposition. The examples above are canonical cases where extraposition is optional. In cases of it-extraposition, the optionality disappears; extraposition is obligatory:

*It that it rained surprised us.
It surprised us that it rained.

*Did it that they had to study disturb them?
Did it disturb them that they had to study?

The star * indicates that the sentence is nonidiomatic. Apparently when it appears in subject or object position, it forces the modifying expression to be extraposed.

== Theoretical accounts ==
The challenge posed by discontinuities has fascinated and vexed theories of syntax since the 1950s. Early transformational grammar, which is based on phrase structure, addressed discontinuities in terms of deep structure and surface structure and transformations that mapped constituents out of one position in Deep Structure into another position in Surface Structure. Modern theories of transformational grammar (e.g. Government and Binding Theory and the Minimalist Program) assume a movement or copying procedure that moves or copies constituents out of one position into another in the course of the derivation. Representational phrase structure grammars (e.g. Head-Driven Phrase Structure Grammar and Lexical Functional Grammar), in contrast, reject movement and in its stead, they assume some sort of feature passing mechanism that passes information about the displaced constituent up and down the tree.

Traditional dependency grammars (e.g. Lucien Tesnière's Structural Syntax and Igor Mel'čuk's Meaning-Text Theory) approach discontinuities much differently. They tend to (posit one or more levels of syntactic structure that) abstract away from linear order and acknowledge hierarchical order alone. If linear order is taken to be (in a sense) secondary in this manner, discontinuities present less of a challenge and are therefore of secondary importance to the theory. Other dependency grammars, in contrast, take linear and hierarchical order to be of equal importance. These theories are likely to (also) pursue some sort of feature passing mechanism that passes information about the displaced unit up and down the tree.

The following trees illustrate the movement/copying type of approach to discontinuities:

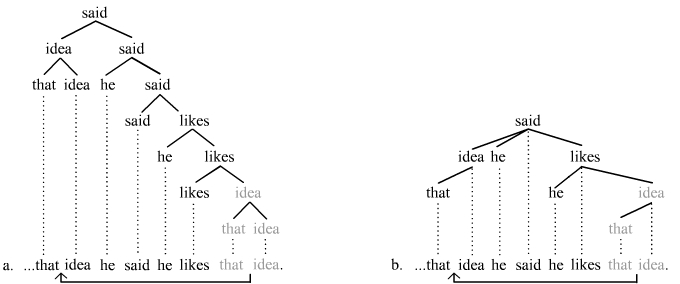

The constituent that idea is seen as being first generated in its canonical position to the right of the verb likes. It is then moved out of that position to the front of the sentence, or it is copied at the front of the sentence followed by the deletion of the lower occurrence. Due to the movement (or copying) this sort of approach to discontinuities can be called the movement approach (= derivational approach).

The alternative to the movement approach is information passing up and down the tree, e.g.

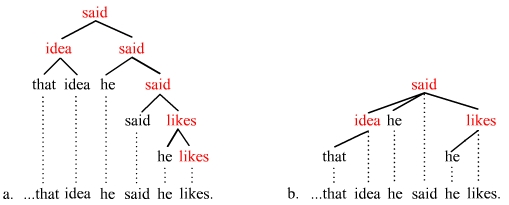

The displaced unit is taken to appear first in its surface position (it is not moved to that position), and information (= features) about it is seen as being passed down the tree to the position where it would appear under more normal circumstances. The path of information passing is shown in red. Due to the passing of information, this sort of approach can be called the feature passing approach (= representational approach). The movement and feature passing approaches have something important in common. They both assume that there are no actual discontinuities in surface syntax (for there are no crossing lines in the trees). What appears to be a discontinuity at first blush is actually rather an indication that movement or feature passing has occurred.

Finally, one point is worth repeating. All theories must have a means of addressing discontinuities, but the nature of this means can vary significantly based upon the amount of structure that the theory at hand posits. Relatively flat structures incur significantly fewer discontinuities than more layered structures. Thus the component that addresses discontinuities plays a larger role in theories that restrict all branching to binary branching. In theories that allow n-ary branching, the role that inversion and shifting play can be greater, which reduces the role of the component of the theory that is needed to address discontinuities.
