= X-bar theory =

Linguistics theory about syntax

In linguistics, X-bar theory is a model of phrase structure and a theory of syntactic category formation that proposes a universal schema for how phrases are organized. It suggests that all phrases share a common underlying structure, regardless of their specific category (noun phrase, verb phrase, etc.). This structure, known as the X-bar schema, is based on the idea that every phrase (XP, X phrase) has a head, which determines the type (syntactic category) of the phrase (X).

The theory was first proposed by Noam Chomsky in 1970 reformulating the ideas of Zellig Harris (1951), and further developed by Ray Jackendoff (1974, 1977a, 1977b), along the lines of the theory of generative grammar put forth in the 1950s by Chomsky. It aimed to simplify and generalize the rules of grammar, addressing limitations of earlier phrase structure models. X-bar theory was an important step forward because it simplified the description of sentence structure. Earlier approaches needed many phrase structure rules, which went against the idea of a simple, underlying system for language. X-bar theory offered a more elegant and economical solution, aligned with the thesis of generative grammar.

X-bar theory was incorporated into both transformational and nontransformational theories of syntax, including government and binding theory (GB), generalized phrase structure grammar (GPSG), lexical-functional grammar (LFG), and head-driven phrase structure grammar (HPSG). Although recent work in the minimalist program has largely abandoned X-bar schema in favor of bare phrase structure approaches, the theory's central assumptions are still valid in different forms and terms in many theories of minimalist syntax.

== Background ==
The X-bar theory was developed to resolve the issues that phrase structure rules (PSR) under the Standard Theory had.

The PSR approach has the following four main issues.

1. It assumes exocentric structures (Note: Phrasal structures that lack a head.) such as "S → NP Aux VP". This is contrary to the fact that phrases have heads in all circumstances.
2. While the sentence John talked to the man, for example, involves the PSR of a verb phrase "VP → V (PP)", (Note: The parentheses indicate that the phrasal category in them is optional.) John talked to the man in person involves the PSR of "VP → V (PP) (PP)". This indicates that it is necessary to posit new PSRs every time when an undefined structure is observed in E-language, which amounts to adding an indiscriminate number of grammatical rules to Universal Grammar. This poses serious issues from the perspectives of the Plato's problem and the poverty of the stimulus.
3. It wrongly rules in structures that are impossible in natural language such as "VP → NP A PP", because as in 1 and 2, the PSR countenances phrases that do not have endocentric structures. (Note: Phrasal structures that include a head.)
4. It fails to capture sentence ambiguities because it assumes flat, nonhierarchical structures.

The X-bar theory is a theory that attempts to resolve these issues by assuming the mold or template phrasal structure of "XP".

== X-bar schema ==
=== Basic principles ===
The "X" in the X-bar theory is equivalent to a variable in mathematics: It can be substituted by syntactic categories such as N, V, A, and P. These categories are lexemes and not phrases: The "X-bar" is a grammatical unit larger than X, thus than a lexeme, and the X-double-bar (=XP) outsizes the X(-single)-bar. X-double-bar categories are equal to phrasal categories such as NP, VP, AP, and PP.

The X-bar theory assumes that all phrasal categories have the structure in Figure 1. This structure is called the X-bar schema.

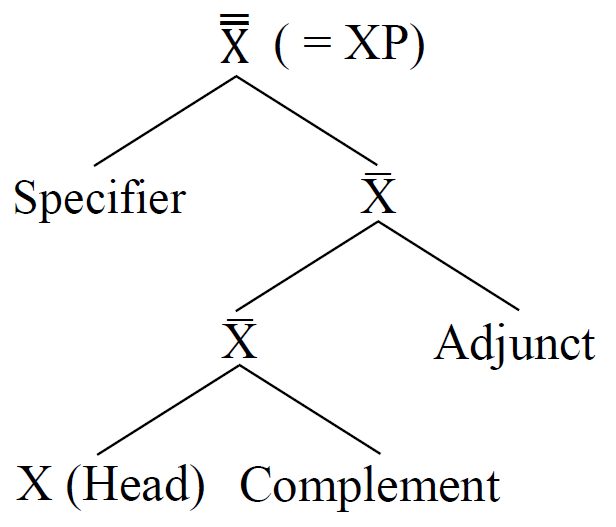
Figure 1

As in Figure 1, the phrasal category XP is notated by an X with a double overbar. (Note: Jackendoff (1977a) assumes bar-levels up to X-triple-bar.) For typewriting reasons, the bar symbol is often substituted by the prime ('), as in X'.

The X-bar theory embodies two central principles.

- Headedness principle: Every phrase has a head.
- Binarity principle: Every node branches into two different nodes.

The headedness principle resolves the issues 1 and 3 above simultaneously. The binarity principle is important to projection and ambiguity, which will be explained below.

The X-bar schema consists of a head and its circumstantial components, in accordance with the headedness principle. The relevant components are as follows:

- Specifier: [obligatory] The node that is in a sister relation with an X' node. This is a term that refers to the syntactic position itself.
- Head: [obligatory] The core of a phrase, into which a lexeme fits. The head determines the form and characteristics of the phrase as a whole.
- Complement: [obligatory] An argument required by the head.
- Adjunct: [optional] A modifier for the phrase constituted by the head.

The specifier, head, and complement are obligatory; hence, a phrasal category XP must contain one specifier, one head, and one complement. On the other hand, the adjunct is optional; hence, a phrasal category contains zero or more adjuncts. Accordingly, when a phrasal category XP does not have an adjunct, it forms the structure in Figure 2.

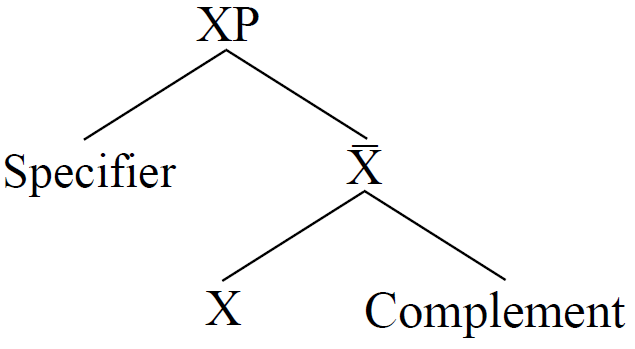
Figure 2

For example, the NP linguistics in the sentence John studies linguistics has the structure in Figure 3.

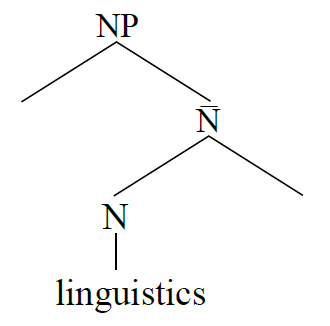
Figure 3

It is important that even if there are no candidates that can fit into the specifier and complement positions, these positions are syntactically present, and thus they are merely empty and unoccupied. (This is a natural consequence of the binarity principle.) This means that all phrasal categories have fundamentally uniform structures under the X-bar schema, which makes it unnecessary to assume that different phrases have different structures, unlike when one adopts the PSR. (This resolves the second issue above.) In the meantime, one needs to be wary of when such empty positions are representationally omitted as in Figure 4.

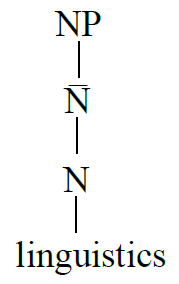
Figure 4

In illustrating syntactic structures this way, at least one X'-level node is present in any circumstance because the complement is obligatory.

Next, the X'' and X' inherit the characteristics of the head X. This trait inheritance is referred to as projection.

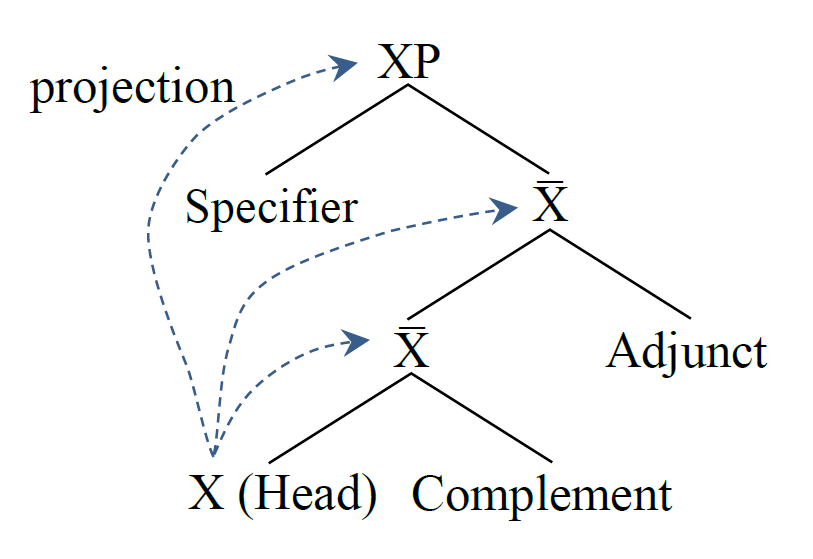
Figure 5

Figure 5 suggests that syntactic structures are derived in a bottom-up fashion under the X-bar theory. More specifically, the structures are derived via the following processes.

1. A lexeme is fitted into the head. Heads are sometimes called zero-level projections because they are X-zero-bar-level categories, notated as X^{0}.
2. The head and the complement are combined to form an X-single-bar (X̅, X') node, which constitutes a semi-phrasal category (a syntactic category not as big as a phrase). This category is called intermediate projection.
3. (An adjunct, if there is any, combines with an X' to form another X'. If there is more than one adjunct, this process is repeated.)
4. An intermediate projection combines with the specifier, forming a complete phrasal category XP (X-double-bar). This category is called maximal projection.

It is important that all the processes except for the third are obligatory. This means that one phrasal category necessarily includes X^{0}, X̅, and XP (=X''). Moreover, nodes bigger than X^{0} (thus, X̅ and XP nodes) are called constituents.

=== Directionality of branching ===
Figures 1–5 are based on the word order of English, but the X-bar schema does not specify the directionality of branching because the binarity principle does not have a rule on it. For example, John read a long book of linguistics with a red cover, which involves two adjuncts, may have either of the structures in Figure 6 or Figure 7. (The figures follow the convention of omitting the inner structures of certain phrasal categories with triangles.)

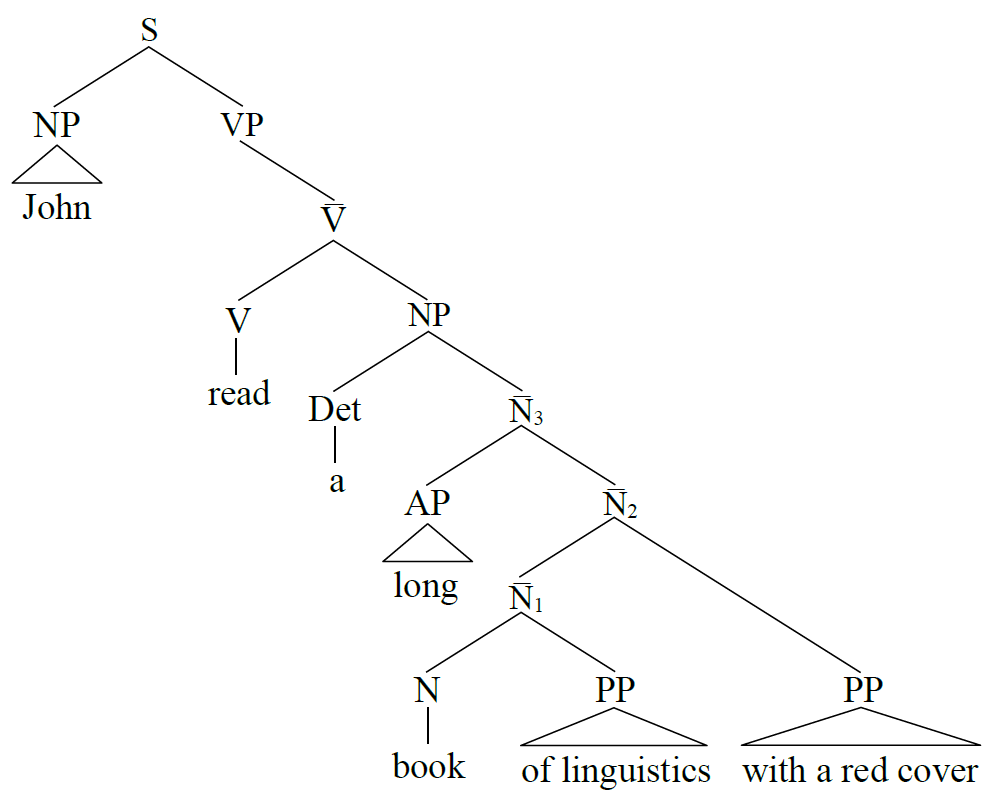
Figure 6

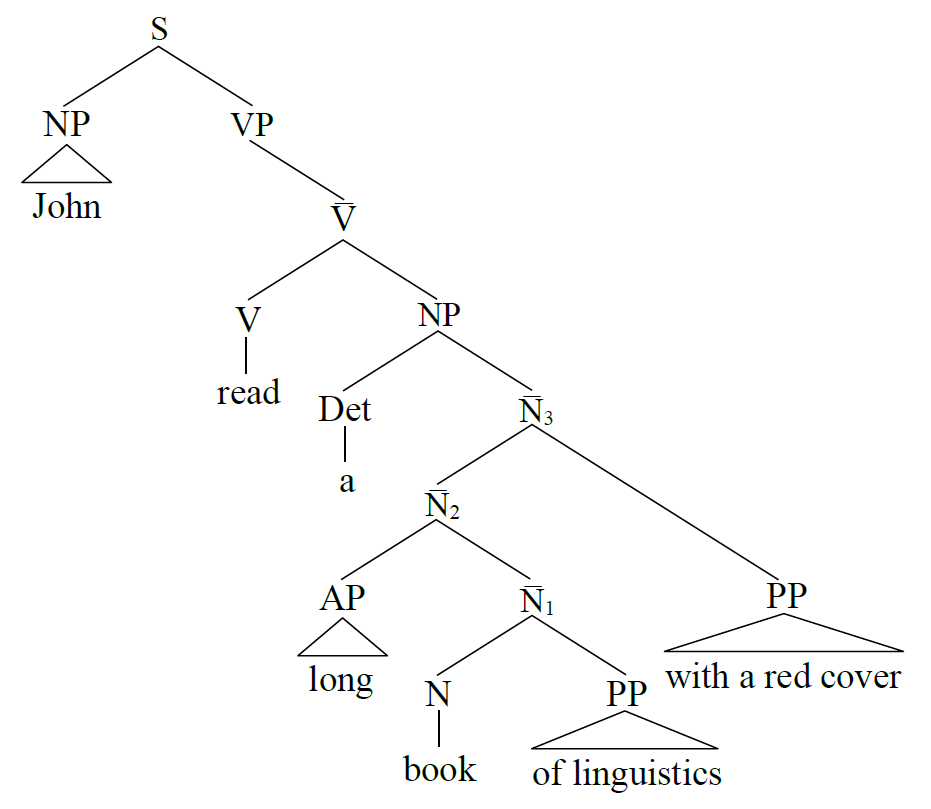
Figure 7

The structure in Figure 6 yields the meaning the book of linguistics with a red cover is long, and the one in Figure 7 the long book of linguistics is with a red cover (see also #Hierarchical structure). What is important is the directionality of the nodes N'_{2} and N'_{3}: one is left-branching, while the other is right-branching. Accordingly, X-bar theory, more specifically the binarity principle, does not impose a restriction on how a node branches.

When it comes to the head and the complement, their relative order is determined based on the principles-and-parameters model of language, more specifically by the head parameter (not by the X-bar schema itself). A principle is a shared, invariable rule of grammar across languages, whereas a parameter is a typologically variable aspect of the grammars. One can either set their parameter with the values of "+" or "-": In the case of the head parameter, one configures the parameter of [±head first], depending on what language they primarily speak. If this parameter is configured to be [+head first], what results is head-initial languages such as English, and if it is configured to be [-head first], what results is head-final languages such as Japanese. For example, the English sentence John ate an apple and its corresponding Japanese sentence have the structures in Figure 8 and Figure 9, respectively.

ジョンが リンゴを 食べた
John-ga ringo-o tabe-ta
John-NOM apple-ACC eat-PAST
'John ate an apple'

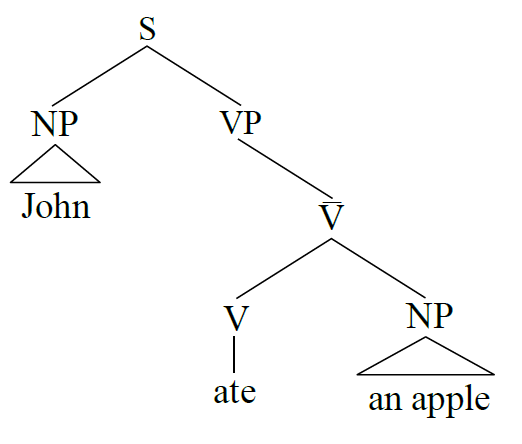
Figure 8

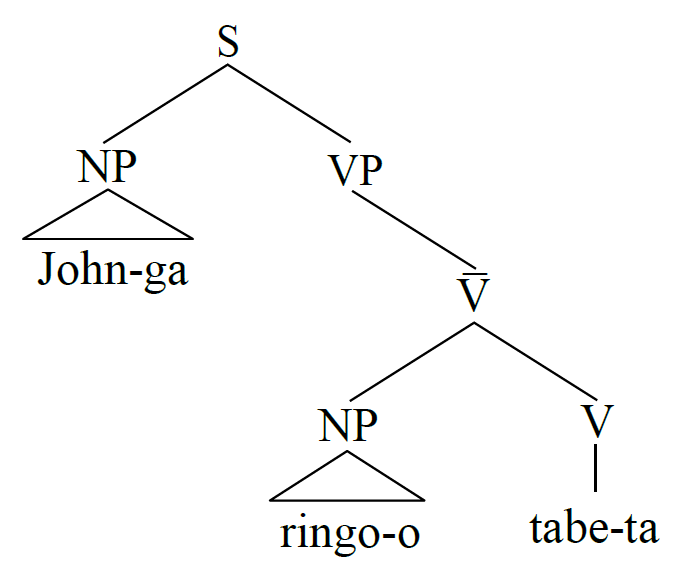
Figure 9

Finally the directionality of the specifier node is in essence unspecified as well, although this is subject to debate: Some argue that the relevant node is necessarily left-branching across languages, the idea of which is (partially) motivated by the fact that both English and Japanese have subjects on the left of a VP, whereas others such as Saito and Fukui (1998) argue that the directionality of the node is not fixed and needs to be externally determined, for example by the head parameter.

== Structure of sentence ==
=== Structure of S ===
Under the PSR, the structure of S (sentence) is illustrated as follows.

- S → NP (Aux) VP

However, this structure violates the headedness principle because it has an exocentric, headless structure, and would also violate the binarity principle if an Aux (auxiliary) occurs, because the S node will then be ternary-branching. Given these, Chomsky (1981) proposed that S is an InflP headed by the functional category Infl(ection), and later in Chomsky (1986a), this category was relabelled as I (hence constitutes an IP), following the notational convention that phrasal categories are represented in the form of XP, with two letters. (Note: The functional category I was later replaced by T(ense) and Agr(eement) along the proposal by Pollock (1989). The functional category Agr, however, was rejected by Chomsky (1995) because it presumably made no contributions at LF. For this reason, clauses are generally assumed to be TPs headed by the functional category T in contemporary linguistic theory.) The category I includes auxiliary verbs such as will and can, clitics such as -s of the third person singular present and -ed of the past tense. This is consistent with the headedness principle, which requires that a phrase have a head, because a sentence (or a clause) necessarily involves an element that determines the inflection of a verb.

Assuming that S constitutes an IP, the structure of the sentence John studies linguistics at the university, for example, can be illustrated as in Figure 10. (Note: In the structure in Figure 10, the linear order of the whole sentence is derived by affix hopping (also known as affix movement). Affix hopping is an operation that is applied at phonological form (PF) after syntactic formation, and in this case, it serves to move the "sound" of the inflectional suffix /-s/ and adjoin it onto the verb. Chomsky (1981) calls this kind of tense affix movement Rule R.)

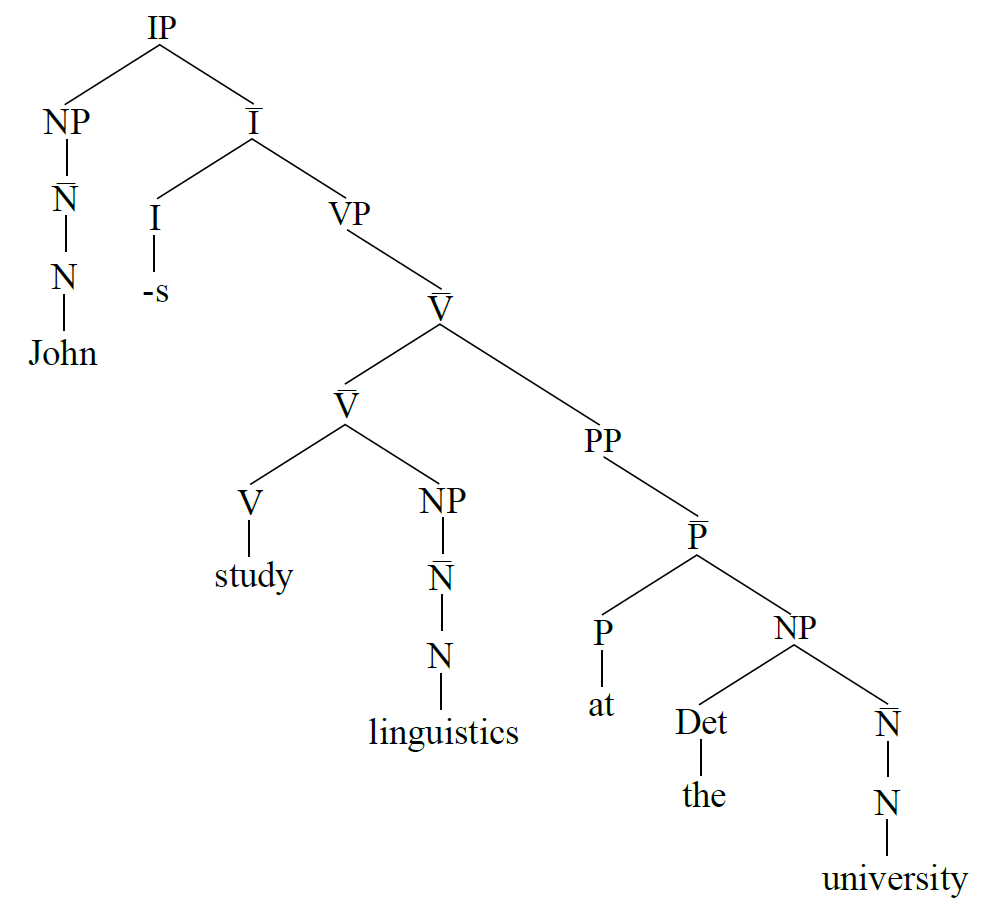
Figure 10

As is obvious, the IP hypothesis makes it possible to regard the grammatical unit of sentence as a phrasal category. It is also important that the configuration in Figure 10 is fully compatible with the central assumptions of the X-bar theory, namely the headedness principle and the binarity principle.

=== Structure of S' ===
Words that introduce subordinate or complement clauses are called complementizers, and representative of them are that, if, and for. (Note: Sometimes, whether is also regarded as a complementizer, but many researchers such as Nakajima (1996) analyze that whether does not occur in the head position of CP, but in the specifier position of CP (Spec-CP), just as wh-words do. This amounts to saying that whether is not a C^{0}: It is subject to debate as to which syntactic category it belongs to.) Under the PSR, complement clauses were assumed to constitute the category S'.

- S' → COMP S

Chomsky (1986a) proposed that this category is in fact a CP headed by the functional category C. The sentence I think that John is honest, for example, then has the following structure.

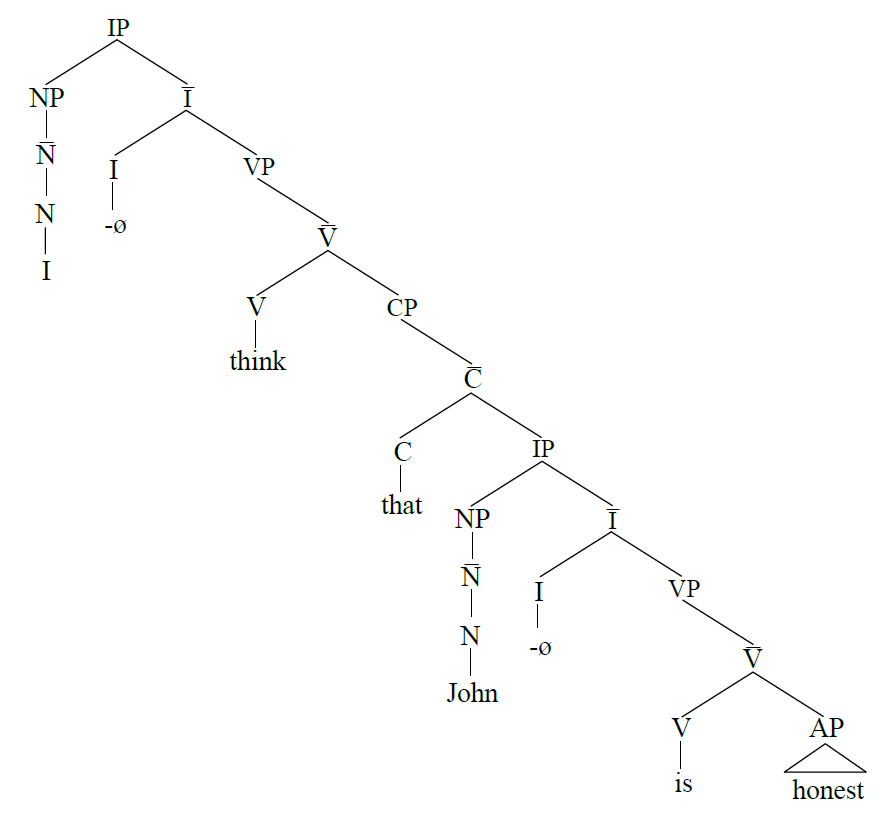
Figure 11

Moreover, Chomsky (1986a) assumes that the landing site of wh-movement is the specifier position of CP (Spec-CP). Accordingly, the wh-question What did John eat?, for example, is derived as in Figure 12. (Note: Wh-movement is subject to Chomsky's (1973) subjacency condition, and is applied in a successive cyclic manner, thus via every Spec-CP.)

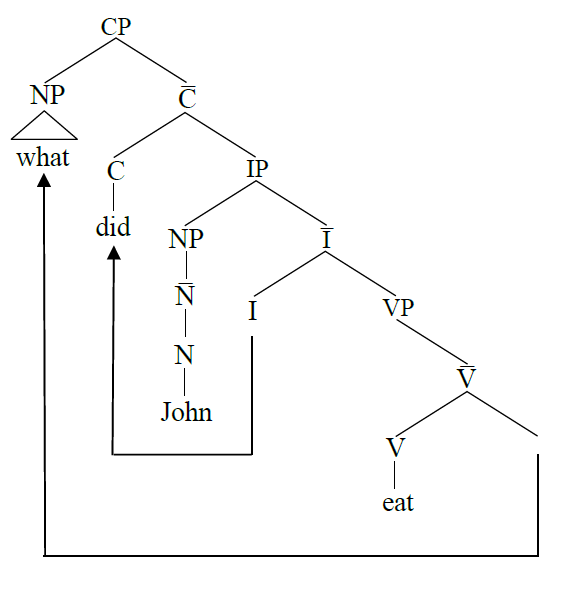
Figure 12

In this derivation, the I-to-C movement is an instance of subject-auxiliary inversion (SAI), or more generally, head movement. (Note: See Baker (1988) for details.)

=== Other phrasal structures ===
- VP-internal subject hypothesis: A hypothesis on the inner structure of VP proposed by researchers such as Yuki Kuroda (1988), Dominique Sportiche (1988), Fukui and Speas (1986) and Kitagawa (1986). It assumes that the sentential subject is base-generated in Spec-VP, not in Spec-IP.
- DP Hypothesis: A hypothesis proposed by Abney (1987), according to whom noun phrases are not NPs but DPs headed by the functional category D.
- VP shell: An analysis put forth by Larson (1988), which assumes two-layered structures of VP. Later in Chomsky (1995a, 1995b), the higher VP was replaced by vP headed by the functional category v (little/small v, traditionally written in italics).
- PredP Hypothesis: A hypothesis proposed by Bowers (1993, 2001), according to whom small clauses are PredPs headed by the functional category Pred.
- Bare Phrase Structure (BPS): A replacement of the X-bar theory put forth by Chomsky (1995a, 1995b). It dispenses with a "template" structure like the X-bar schema, and yields syntactic structures by (iterative applications of) an operation called Merge, which serves to connect two syntactic objects such as words and phrases into one. Some radical versions of it even reject syntactic category labels such as V and A. See also Minimalist Program.

== Hierarchical structure ==
The PSR has the shortcoming of being incapable of capturing sentence ambiguities.

- I saw a man with binoculars.

This sentence is ambiguous between the reading I saw a man, using binoculars, in which with binoculars modifies the VP, and the reading I saw a man who had binoculars, in which the PP modifies the NP. Under the PSR model, the sentence above is subject to the following two parsing rules.

- S → NP VP
- VP → V NP PP

The sentence's structure under these PSRs would be as in Figure 13.

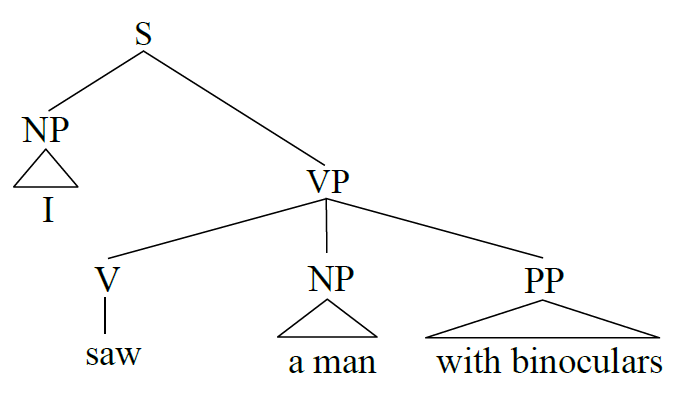
Figure 13

It is obvious that this structure fails to capture the NP modification reading because [_{PP} with binoculars] modifies the VP no matter how one tries to illustrate the structure. The X-bar theory, however, successfully captures the ambiguity as demonstrated in the configurations in Figure 14 and 15 below, because it assumes hierarchical structures in accordance with the binarity principle.

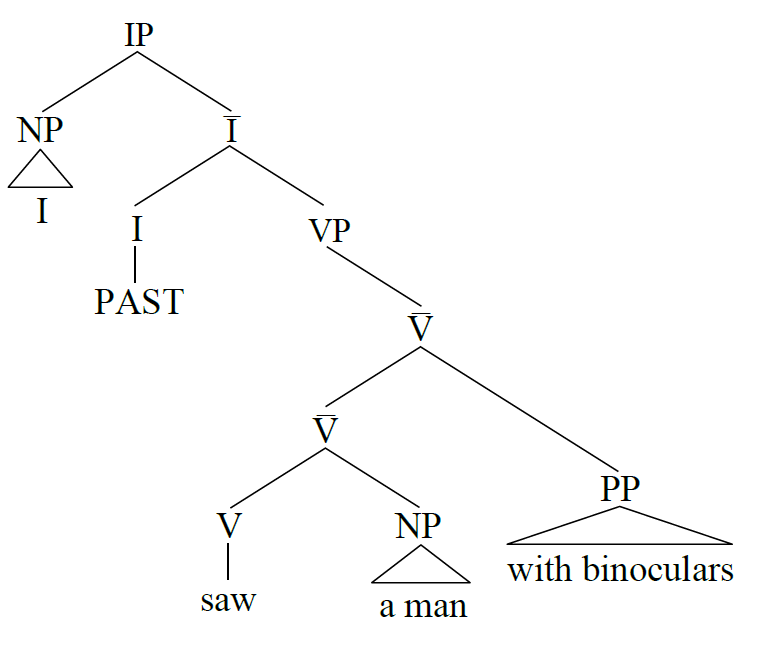
Figure14

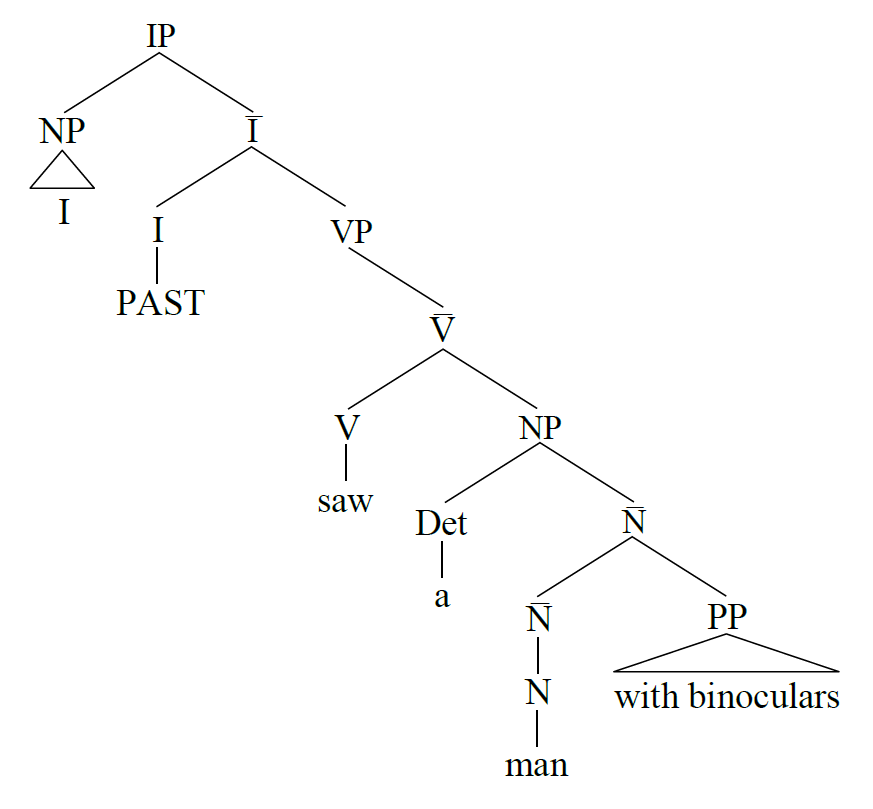
Figure15

Thus, the X-bar theory resolves the fourth issue mentioned in § Background as well. There is always a unilateral relation from syntax to semantics (never from semantics to syntax) in any version of generative grammar because syntactic computation starts from the lexicon, then continues into the syntax, then into Logical Form (LF) at which meanings are computed. This is so under any of Standard Theory (Chomsky, 1965), Extended Standard Theory (Chomsky, 1972), and Revised Extended Standard Theory (Chomsky, 1981).

== See also ==
- Antisymmetry
- Linguistics
- Natural language
- Syntax
- Constituent (linguistics)
- Parse tree
- Head (linguistics)
- Complement (linguistics)
- Phrase
- Syntactic category
- Lexical category
- Functional category
- Part of speech
- Node (linguistics)
- Generative grammar
- Universal Grammar
- Plato's problem
- Poverty of the stimulus
- Transformational grammar
- Phrase structure grammar
- Phrase structure rule
- Standard Theory
- Extended Standard Theory
- Revised Extended Standard Theory
- Government and binding theory
- C-command
- Principles-and-parameters approach
- Minimalist Program
