= Lingua Franca Nova grammar =

LFN has an analytic grammar and resembles the grammars of languages such as the Haitian Creole, Papiamento, and Afrikaans. On the other hand, it uses a vocabulary drawn from several modern romance languages – Portuguese, Spanish, Catalan, French, and Italian.

Complete grammars are available on the official website in several languages: LFN, German, English, Spanish, Esperanto, French, Italian, Polish, Russian, Finnish.

== Word order ==
LFN has a fairly strict word order. The general word order is:

subject noun phrase — verb phrase (— object noun phrase)

Joan core — "John runs"
Maria oia Joan — "Maria hears John"

A noun phrase has this order:

(determiners —) (quantifiers —) noun (— adjectives)

La tre omes grande... — "The three large men..."
La multe femes peti... — "The many small women..."

A verb phrase has this order:

(tense/mood —) verb (— adverb)

...ia come rapida — "...ate quickly..."
...va come lente — "...will eat slowly..."

A prepositional phrase generally follows what it modifies, and has this order:

preposition — noun phrase

...en la cosina — "...in the kitchen"
...pos medianote — "...after midnight"

== Nouns ==
The roles of nouns in a sentence are indicated through prepositions and word order. There are no cases.

Nouns are commonly preceded by determiners. Plural nouns are formed by appending -s to nouns ending in vowels or -es to nouns ending in consonants. This does not alter the stress:

- casa > casas — house > houses
- fem > femes — woman > women

Mass nouns include liquids, powders, and substances, such as acua (water), arena (sand), and lenio (wood). They do not normally require determiners or the plural. However, one may add these to indicate specific examples or different types:

- la acua — the water (e.g. in the cup)
- lenios — woods (e.g. various kinds)

Gender is typically not indicated. If necessary, nouns may be followed by mas (male) or fema (female):

- un cavalo mas / un cavalo fema — a stallion / a mare

A few terms for family members and traditional roles do show distinctions of gender. For example:

- madre / padre — mother / father
- fio / fia — son / daughter
- prinse / prinsesa — prince / princess

A noun can be made into an abstract noun by adding -ia (-ity, -ness, -ship, -hood). In this way madre (mother) becomes madria (motherhood).

Apposition — the use of one noun to modify another — is mostly limited to names and titles:

- san Josef — Saint Joseph
- mea sore Maria — my sister Mary

== Determiners ==
Determiners in LFN precede the noun they modify. There are two articles: la (the) and un (a), used as in English:

- la om, un fem, e enfantes — the man, a woman, and children

Other words function similarly:

tota — all ambos — both esta — this, these acel — that, those cada — every, each cualce — whatever, whichever alga — some, several, a few no — no, zero	multe — many, much poca — few, little plu — more min — less, fewer otra — other mesma — same tal — such

In addition, numbers and possessive determiners (see below) are also used.

There is a default order of determiners, but variations are acceptable as long as the meaning is clear:

1. tota, ambos
2. la, esta, acel
3. alga, cada, cualce
4. mea, tua...
5. un, du, tre...
6. multe, poca, plu, min
7. otra, mesma, tal
8. bon, mal

== Pronouns ==
Personal pronouns are invariant:

me — I, me tu — you (singular) el — she, her, he, him lo — it on – one	nos — we, us vos — you (plural) los — they, them

El is used for people and higher animals. Its use can be extended metaphorically to lower animals, robots, the moon, hurricanes, etc. Lo is used for things, simple animals, plants, ideas, etc. The exact dividing line is left to the speaker.

There is an indefinite pronoun on, which is used like German "man" or French "on":

- On debe segue la regulas — "One must follow the rules."

There are no gender distinctions between "he" and "she". If gender is significant, one can use words like la fem, la om, la fia, la fio, la fema, la mas (the woman, the man, the daughter, the son, the female, the male), etc, or gender-irrelevant terms such as la plu grande, la carnor, or la otra (the bigger one, the butcher, the other one).

Unlike in the Romance languages, there is no polite/impolite contrast for the second person: tu is always used for the singular, vos always for the plural.

The reflexive pronouns are also me, nos, tu, and vos. For the third person, singular and plural, LFN uses se:

- Me ia lava me — "I washed myself."
- El ama se — "He loves himself," "She loves herself."

The possessive determiners are mea, nosa, tua, and vosa. Sua is used for all third persons:

- Tua gato es ala — "Your cat is over there."
- Tu es sempre en mea mente — "You are always in my mind."

For the possessive pronouns, LFN uses the possessive determiners, preceded by la:

- La mea es plu grande ca la tua — "Mine is bigger than yours."

Other pronouns include the following:

ci — who cadun — everyone, everybody algun — someone, somebody cualcun — anyone, anybody nun — no one, nobody esta — this one estas — these ones acel — that one aceles — those ones multe — much, many	cual — what cada cosa — everything alga cosa — something cualce cosa — anything, whatever no cosa — nothing esta — this (thing) estas — these (things) acel — that (thing) aceles — those (things) poca — little, few

== Verbs ==
There are no conjugations of verbs in LFN. The basic form remains the same regardless of person, number, tense, mood, aspect, etc.

The present tense is represented by the verb by itself:

- La om come — "The man eats", "The man is eating."

The present tense is also used to indicate habitual actions and states, facts of nature, mathematics, or logic, and as a "historical" tense, such as when relating a story that has been clearly established as occurring in the past:

- La sol leva en la este — "The sun rises in the east."
- Me labora a la universia — "I work at the university."

The past tense is indicated by the particle ia:

- Maria ia come — "Maria ate," "Maria has eaten."

The future tense is indicated by the particle va:

- Joan va come pronto — "John will eat soon."

The particle ta indicates the irrealis mood and can be used where other languages might use a conditional or subjunctive mood. Its use is optional:

- Me ia duta ce el ta vole vade — "I doubted that he would want to go."
- Me ta es felis si la sol ta brilia — "I would be happy if the sun were shining."

One combination ― ia ta ― is used to express "would have":

- Me ia ta es un bon re ― "I would have been a good king."

Certain adverbs and verbal constructions add precision to the tenses:

- Me come aora ― "I am eating now."
- Me ia come ja ― "I ate already", "I have eaten", "I had eaten."
- Me va come a pos ― "I will eat afterwards."
- Me ia fini leje la libro ― "I (have) finished reading the book."
- Doman, me va comensa leje un otra ― "Tomorrow, I will begin to read another."

Negation is indicated by putting no before the tense particle or (in the present tense) the verb. Double negatives should be avoided:

- El no ia pensa ce algun ia es asi ― "He didn't think anyone was here."

Commands are indicated by dropping the subject pronoun. Hortative sentences include the subject, but are preceded by ta ce ("would that..."):

- Boli la acua! ― "Boil the water!"
- Ta ce nos dansa! ― "Let's dance!" "Shall we dance?"
- Ta ce tu pasa la sal, per favore? — "Pass the salt, please."

Lo and on are used as dummy pronouns before verbs that refer to weather or other general situations:

- Lo va pluve ― "It's going to rain."
- Lo es tro calda en esta sala ― "It is too hot in this room." (Or Esta sala es tro calda)
- Lo pare ce tu es coreta ― "It seems that you are correct."
- On no ave pexes en esta lago ― "There aren't fish in this lake." (Or Esta lago no ave pexes)

A verb that is fundamentally intransitive may be used as a transitive causal verb by moving the original subject to the object position, and adding a new subject:

- La acua ia boli ― "The water boiled" > Me ia boli la acua ― "I boiled the water."
- La porte ia abri ― "The door opened" > Me ia abri la porte ― "I opened the door."

The infinitive is identical to the basic form of the verb. It acts like an abstract noun, but accepts an object or an adverb. It can appear as a subject or an object of the verb, and it has no determiner:

- Leje xines es difisil ― "Reading Chinese is difficult."
- Nos ia nesesa come rapida. ― "We needed to eat quickly."
- Los gusta dansa. ― "They like to dance," "They like dancing."

In LFN, verbs often come in pairs. The first verb is like the modal verb in English. However, the idea goes beyond modals to include "attitudinal" verbs such as finje (pretend) and pare (seem). The second verb is simply the infinitive, as in English:

- Me va atenta vola doman. ― "I will try to fly tomorrow."
- On debe brosi la dentes a cada dia. ― "One should (ought to) brush one's teeth every day."

A verb can be used as a noun, known as a verbal noun, without change by adding la or other determiner. It represents a particular occurrence of the verb:

- La samba es un dansa. ― "The samba is a dance."
- Do es la dansa? ― "Where is the dance?"
- Mea pronunsia de xines es riable ― "My pronunciation of chinese is laughable."

Verbs can be made into adjectives: The active participle is formed by adding -nte to the verb. For example, come becomes comente, meaning "eating". This should never be used as a gerund, as it often is in English (e.g. "I love eating” is ‘’me ama come’’).

The active participle as an adjective can take an object.

- Joan es la om comente spageti. ― "John is the man eating spaghetti."
- Alternatively: Joan es la om ci come spageti ― "John is the man who eats spaghetti."

One can emphasize the idea that the subject is in the midst of an activity or process (the progressive aspect) using the active participle. Or one can use expressions such as en la media de:

- Nos ia es comente cuando la tempesta ia comensa ― "We were eating when the storm began."
- Nos ia es en la media de come cuando la tempesta ia comensa ― "We were in the middle of eating when the storm began."

The passive participle is formed by adding -da to the verb. For example, come becomes comeda, meaning "eaten". This should not be confused with the past tense (me ia ama la pan is "I loved the bread").

The passive participle can be used to express the passive voice. Or one can usa a generic subject pronoun instead:

- Si tu no asconde la torta, lo va es comeda ― "If you don't hide the cake, it will be eaten."
- Si tu no asconde la torta, algun va come lo ― "If you don't hide the cake, someone will eat it."

Subject complements are introduced by es or verbs such as pare (seem) and deveni (become):

- La fem ia es bela. — "The woman was beautiful."
- Me va deveni un psicolojiste — "I will become a psychologist."

Object complements are introduced by the preposition a:

- Me ia pinta la casa a roja. — "I painted the house red."
- Los ia eleje el a presidente. — "They elected him president."

== Adjectives ==
Adjectives follow the noun they modify, with two exceptions: bon (good) and mal (bad) may come before the noun, due to their frequent use.

Unlike the natural Romance languages, adjectives in LFN do not have gender or plural forms, i.e. they don't "agree" with the nouns they describe.

The comparative is made with plu (more) or min (less). "The most" is la plu and "the least" is la min:

- Jan es plu bon ca Jo, ma Jil es la plu bon. ― "Jan is better than Jo, but Jill is the best."

Equivalence is indicated with tan... como:

- Marco es tan grande como Mona. ― "Mark is as big as Mona."

Like verbs, adjectives can be used as nouns. For example, bela means "beautiful", but un bela means "a beautiful one" or "a beauty." This works with participles, too: la studiante and la studiada mean "the student" and "the studied," respectively, from the verb studia, "study."

- La pluve cade egal sur la bon e la mal ― "The rain falls equally on the good and the bad."
- Tua donadas de vestes es sempre bonvenida ― "Your gifts of clothing are always welcome."

An adjective can be made into an abstract noun by adding -ia (-ity, -ness, -ship, -hood). In this way bela becomes belia, meaning beauty.

== Adverbs ==
LFN doesn't have an explicit way of marking adverbs. Un om felis for example means "a happy man", whereas el dansa felis means "he/she dances happily". Instead, any adjective can be used as an adverb by placing it after the verb or after a pronoun object, or at the beginning of the sentence

- el atenda seria a la jua ― "he paid serious attention to the game"
- el lansa lo forte ― "he threw it hard"
- strana, el ia nomi sua gato "can" ― "strangely, he named his cat 'dog'"

Adverbs used to modify adjectives precede the adjective. Dedicated adverbs, such as aora and oji can fall anywhere, as long as they don't cause confusion.

Examples of common adverbs include the following:

aora ― now alora ― then ancora ― still, yet ja ― already sempre ― always nunca ― never cuasi – almost an ― even	ier ― yesterday oji ― today doman ― tomorrow asi ― here ala ― there tro ― too (excessively) apena ― barely, scarcely cisa – maybe

== Prepositions ==
Prepositions are placed before the noun or noun phrase, and the prepositional phrase is placed after the noun being modified, or, if used adverbially, at the beginning of the sentence or after the verb. There are 22 basic prepositions in LFN:

a ― at, to ante ― before, in front of asta ― until ca ― than como ― like con ― with contra ― against de ― of, from, since en ― in, into, during entre ― between, among estra ― out of, except	longo ― along par ― by per ― for, in order to pos ― after, behind, according to sin ― without sirca ― around, approximately su ― below, under, beneath supra ― above, over sur ― on, about, concerning tra ― through ultra ― beyond, past, across

Some prepositions can be used as adverbs by placing a or de before them.

- a su ― down, below, downstairs
- a pos ― after, afterwards, behind, out back
- de supra – from above

== Coordinating conjunctions ==
There are three coordinating conjunctions in LFN and three correlative conjunctions:

e ― and o ― or ma ― but, yet	e ... e ... ― both ... and ... o ... o ... ― either ... or ... no ... (e) no ... ― neither ... nor ...

== Questions ==
There are a number of interrogative words that are used to introduce questions:

cual ― what, which ci ― who, whom de ci ― whose, of whom cuando ― when	do ― where como ― how cuanto ― how much, how many perce ― why

(Note that cual is used both as a determiner and as a pronoun. These are also used to introduce subordinate clauses, discussed below.)

For example:

- Cuanto on paia per lete asi? ― "How much does one pay for milk here?"
- Cual auto tu gusta la plu? ― "Which car do you like the best?"
- Perce tu no gusta esta? ― "Why don't you like this one?"
- Cuando tu espeta ce el ariva? ― "When do you expect him to arrive?"

Questions may include one of these words or may be indicated by rising intonation alone. One may also express questions by beginning the sentence with the interrogative particle esce ("is it that... ?") or by adding no (no) or si (yes) to the end of the sentence. In writing, questions always end with a question mark (?):

- Como on construi un casa per avias? ― "How do you make a bird house?"
- Tu vole dansa? ― "Do you want to dance?"
- Esce tu parla Deutx? ― "Do you speak German?"
- Tu parla Italian, no? ― "You speak Italian, don't you?"

== Clauses ==
=== Relative clauses ===
Relative clauses (or adjective clauses) function like adjectives. There are two relative pronouns which typically introduce relative clauses:

cual ― which, that
ci ― who, whom

Relative clauses follow the noun or noun phrase that they modify:

- La fem ci me ama veni de Frans. ― "The woman (whom) I love comes from France."
- La robot cual me ia construi no opera. ― "The robot (that) I built doesn't work."
- Me no comprende lo cual tu intende. ― "I don't understand what you mean."

Relative pronouns may be preceded by prepositions:

- La cosa per cual me espera la plu es un bisicle nova. ― "The thing I wish for the most is a new bicycle."
- La fem de ci nos parla labora a mea ofisia. ― "The woman of whom we speak works at my office."

Cuando and do can also be used to introduce relative clauses:

- Esta es la site do me vole abita. ― "This is the city where I want to live."
- Me ia vade ala en la anio cuando me ia fini mea studias. ― "I went there in the year when I finished my studies."

=== Noun clauses ===
Noun clauses function the same way that nouns and noun phrases do in a sentence. Two subordinating conjunctions commonly introduce noun clauses:

ce ― that
esce ― whether

For example:

- Me pensa ce el es bela. ― "I think that she is beautiful."
- La gato entra la sala sin ce algun vide el. ― "The cat entered the room without anyone seeing it."
- Me demanda a me esce el ama me. ― "I wonder whether she loves me."

Relative pronouns and interrogative words can also introduce noun clauses:

- Me no pote recorda ci me es. ― "I can't remember who I am."
- Me gusta como el parla. ― "I like how he talks."
- Me no sabe cuando me va parti. ― I don't know when I will leave."
- Me sabe cual tu desira per natal ― "I know what you want for Christmas."

=== Adverbial clauses ===
Adverbial clauses function like adverbs, modifying the verb or the sentence as a whole. Some are introduced by these subordinating conjunctions:

si ― if
afin ― so that, in order that
car ― because

Adverbial clauses usually follow the main clause:

- Me ta pote vade si me ta ave un auto. ― "I would be able to go if I had a car."
- Me no teme la can car el es multe peti. ― "I am not afraid of the dog because it is very small."
- Me core afin la rinoseros no catura me. ― "I'm running so that the rhinos don't catch me."

Some of the interrogative words can also be used to introduce adverbial clauses:

- La lupos cria cuando los vide la luna ― "The wolves howl when they see the moon."
- Me vole abita do la clima es bon ― "I want to live where the weather is good."
- Me vive como me vole vive. ― "I live as I want to live."

Do and cuando are often preceded by prepositions:

a do ― to where, whither de do ― from where, whence de cuando ― since	pos cuando ― after en cuando ― while asta cuando ― until

For example:

- El ia pote sci ante cuando el ia pote pasea. ― "He could ski before he could walk."
- Me gusta escuta a la radio en cuando me labora. ― "I like to listen to the radio while I work."

== Numbers ==
Numbers in LFN are as follows:

0 ― zero 1 ― un 2 ― du 3 ― tre 4 ― cuatro 5 ― sinco	6 ― ses 7 ― sete 8 ― oto 9 ― nove 10 ― des

Higher numbers are constructed as follows:

11 ― des-un 20 ― dudes 100 ― sento 321 ― tresento-dudes-un	1000 ― mil 45 678 ― cuatrodes-sinco mil sessento-setedes-oto 1 000 000 ― milion 1 000 000 000 ― mil milion

Numbers that express quantity precede the noun; numbers that express order follow the noun:

- la tre omes, "the three men"
- la om tre, "the third man"

Fractions are constructed with -i, e.g. dui, tri, cuatri,... desi, senti, mili, etc. These are also used as verbs meaning "to halve", "to divide into three parts", etc.

Multiples and groups can be referred to with -uple, as in duple ― "double, duo, couple, pair". Add -i to make a verb, such as dupli - "to double".
