= Endocentric and exocentric =

Distinction between grammatical constructions

In theoretical linguistics, a distinction is made between endocentric and exocentric constructions. A grammatical construction (for instance, a phrase or compound) is said to be endocentric if it fulfils the same linguistic function as one of its parts, and exocentric if it does not. The distinction reaches back at least to Bloomfield's work of the 1930s, who based it on terms by Pāṇini and Patañjali in Sanskrit grammar. Such a distinction is possible only in phrase structure grammars (constituency grammars), since in dependency grammars all constructions are necessarily endocentric.

== Endocentric construction ==
An endocentric construction consists of an obligatory head and one or more dependents, whose presence serves to modify the meaning of the head. For example:

1. [_{NP} [_{A} big] [_{N} house]]
2. [_{VP} [_{V} sing] [_{N} songs]]
3. [_{AP} [_{Adv} very] [_{A} long]]

These phrases are indisputably endocentric. They are endocentric because the one word in each case carries the bulk of the semantic content and determines the syntactic category to which the whole constituent will be assigned. The phrase big house is a noun phrase in line with its part house, which is a noun. Similarly, sing songs is a verb phrase in line with its part sing, which is a verb. The same is true of very long; it is an adjective phrase in line with its part long, which is an adjective. In more formal terms, the distribution of an endocentric construction is functionally equivalent, or approaching equivalence, to one of its parts, which serves as the center, or head, of the whole. An endocentric construction is also known as a headed construction, where the head is contained "inside" the construction.

== Exocentric construction ==
An exocentric construction consists of two or more parts, whereby the one or the other of the parts cannot be viewed as providing the bulk of the semantic content of the whole. Further, the syntactic distribution of the whole cannot be viewed as being determined by the one or the other of the parts. The classic instance of an exocentric construction is the sentence (in a phrase structure grammar). The traditional binary division of the sentence (S) into a subject noun phrase (NP) and a predicate verb phrase (VP) was exocentric:

Hannibal destroyed Rome. - Sentence (S)

Since the whole is unlike either of its parts, it is exocentric. In other words, since the whole is neither a noun (N) like Hannibal nor a verb phrase (VP) like destroyed Rome but rather a sentence (S), it is exocentric. With the advent of X-bar theory in Transformational Grammar in the 1970s, this traditional exocentric division was largely abandoned and replaced by an endocentric analysis, whereby the sentence is viewed as an inflection phrase (IP), which is essentially a projection of the verb (a fact that makes the sentence a big VP in a sense). Thus, with the advent of X-bar theory, the endocentric vs. exocentric distinction started to become less important in transformational theories of syntax, for without the concept of exocentricity, the notion of endocentricity was becoming vacuous.

By contrast, in constraint-based syntactic theories, such as Lexical Functional Grammar (LFG), exocentric constructions are still widely used, but with a different role. Exocentricity is used in the treatment of non-configurational languages. As constraint-based models such as LFG do not represent a "deep structure" at which non-configurational languages can be treated as configurational, the exocentric S is used to formally represent the flat structure inherent in a non-configurational language. Hence, in a constraint-based analysis of Warlpiri, an exocentric structure follows the auxiliary, dominating all of the verb, arguments and adjuncts which are not raised to the specifier position of the IP:

[_{IP} [_{NP} Ngarrka-ngku][_{AUX} ka][_{S} [_{NP} wawirri][_{V} panti-rni]]]
'The man is spearing the kangaroo'

In addition, in theories of morphology, the distinction remains, since certain compounds seem to require an exocentric analysis, e.g. have-not in Bill is a have-not. For a class of compounds described as exocentric, see bahuvrihi.

== The distinction in dependency grammars ==
The endo- vs. exocentric distinction is possible in phrase structure grammars (= constituency grammars), since they are constituency-based. The distinction is hardly present in dependency grammars, since they are dependency-based. In other words, dependency-based structures are necessarily endocentric, i.e. they are necessarily headed structures. Dependency grammars by definition were much less capable of acknowledging the types of divisions that constituency enables. Acknowledging exocentric structure necessitates that one posit more nodes in the syntactic (or morphological) structure than one has actual words or morphs in the phrase or sentence at hand. What this means is that a significant tradition in the study of syntax and grammar has been incapable from the start of acknowledging the endo- vs. exocentric distinction, a fact that has generated confusion about what should count as an endo- or exocentric structure.

== Representing endo- and exocentric structures ==
Theories of syntax (and morphology) represent endocentric and exocentric structures using tree diagrams and specific labeling conventions. The distinction is illustrated here using the following trees. The first three trees show the distinction in a constituency-based grammar, and the second two trees show the same structures in a dependency-based grammar:

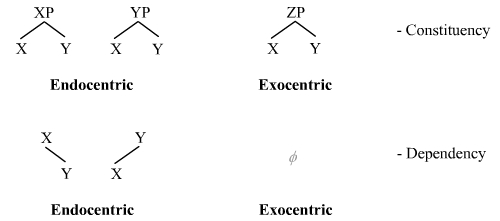

The upper two trees on the left are endocentric since each time, one of the parts, i.e. the head, projects its category status up to the mother node. The upper tree on the right, in contrast, is exocentric, because neither of the parts projects its category status up to the mother node; Z is a category distinct from X or Y. The two dependency trees show the manner in which dependency-based structures are inherently endocentric. Since the number of nodes in the tree structure is necessarily equal to the number of elements (e.g. words) in the string, there is no way to assign the whole (i.e. XY) a category status that is distinct from both X and Y.

Traditional phrase structure trees are mostly endocentric, although the initial binary division of the clause is exocentric (S → NP VP), as mentioned above, e.g.

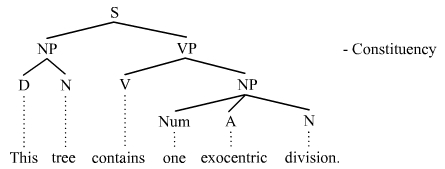

This tree structure contains four divisions, whereby only one of these divisions is exocentric (the highest one). The other three divisions are endocentric because the mother node has the same basic category status as one of its daughters. The one exocentric division disappears in the corresponding dependency tree:

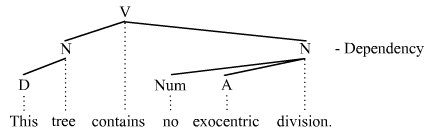

Dependency positions the finite verb as the root of the entire tree, which means the initial exocentric division is impossible. This tree is entirely endocentric.

== In languages ==
=== Chinese ===
The Chinese language is known for having rich compounds. Linguists often classify compound verbs in Chinese into five types: Subject-Predicate 主謂結構 (SP), Verb-Object 述賓結構 (VO), Verb-Complement 述補結構 (VC), Coordinative 並列結構 (VV), and Endocentric 偏正結構. The Coordinative, Verb-Complement, and Endocentric types are also known as Parallel, Verb-Resultative, and Modifier-Head, respectively.

Below are a few examples of the exocentric compounds in Chinese.

Example	Internal Structure	Explanation
大小dà-xiǎo	A-A → N	big + small → size
好歹hǎo-dǎi	A-A → Adv	good + bad → anyhow
開關kāi-guān	V-V → N	open + close → switch
保守bǎo-shǒu	V-V → A	keep + defend → conservative
物色wù-sè	N-N → V	item + color → choose from
矛盾máo-dùn	N-N → A	spear + shield → contradictory

=== Warlpiri ===
The Warlpiri language is widely held as the canonical example of a non-configurational language. As such, Warlpiri sentences exhibit exceptionally flat surface structure. If a non-derivational approach is taken to syntactic structure, this can best be formalised with exocentric S dominated by the auxiliary in I. Thus, an example analysis of the constituent structure of the Warlpiri sentence:

Ngarrka-ngku ka wawirri panti-rni
man-ERG AUX kangaroo.ABS spear-NPAST
'the man is spearing the kangaroo'

would be as follows:

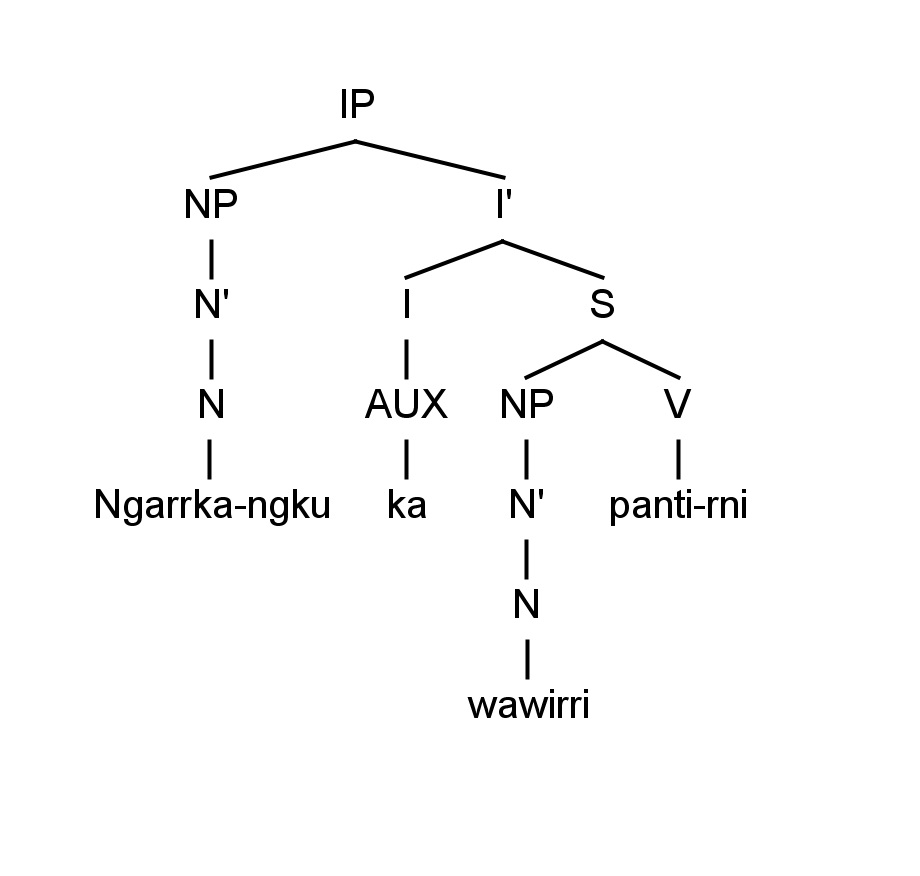
Constituent structure tree diagram for Warlpiri sentence "the man is spearing the kangaroo"

Where S is a non-projected exocentric structure which dominates both heads and phrases with equal weight. The elements in spec of IP and under S can be freely moved and switch places, as position in c-structure, except for I, plays a pragmatic rather than syntactic role in a constraints-based analysis of Warlpiri sentence structure.

== A note about coordinate structures ==
While exocentric structures have largely disappeared from most theoretical analyses of standard sentence structure, many theories of syntax still assume (something like) exocentric divisions for coordinate structures, e.g.

[Sam] and [Larry] arrived.
She [laughed] and [cried].
[Should I] or [should I not] go to that conference?

The brackets each time mark the conjuncts of a coordinate structure, whereby this coordinate structure includes the material appearing between the left-most bracket and the right-most bracket; the coordinator is positioned between the conjuncts. Coordinate structures like these do not lend themselves to an endocentric analysis in any clear way, nor to an exocentric analysis. One might argue that the coordinator is the head of the coordinate structure, which would make it endocentric. This argument would have to ignore the numerous occurrences of coordinate structures that lack a coordinator (asyndeton), however. One might therefore argue instead that coordinate structures like these are multi-headed, each conjunct being or containing a head. The difficulty with this argument, however, is that the traditional endocentric vs. exocentric distinction did not foresee the existence of multi-headed structures, which means that it did not provide a guideline for deciding whether a multi-headed structure should be viewed as endo- or exocentric. Coordinate structures thus remain a problem area for the endo- vs. exocentric distinction in general.

== See also ==
- Bahuvrihi (exocentric compound)
- Compound (linguistics)
- Constituent (linguistics)
- Dependency grammar
- Phrase
- Phrase structure grammar
