= Node (linguistics) =

Point in a tree diagram

In formal syntax, a node is a point in a tree diagram or syntactic tree that can be assigned a syntactic category label.

== Nodes under phrase structure rules ==
Before the emergence of the X-bar theory, thus in the period between Chomsky (1957) and Jackendoff (1977), syntactic structures were represented based on phrase structure rules (PSR).

- The man studies linguistics enthusiastically.

This sentence involves the following five PSRs:

1. S → NP VP
2. NP → Det N (the man)
3. NP → N (linguistics)
4. AdvP → Adv (enthusiastically)
5. VP → V NP AdvP (studies linguistics enthusiastically)

With a tree diagram, the sentence's structure can be depicted as in Figure 1.

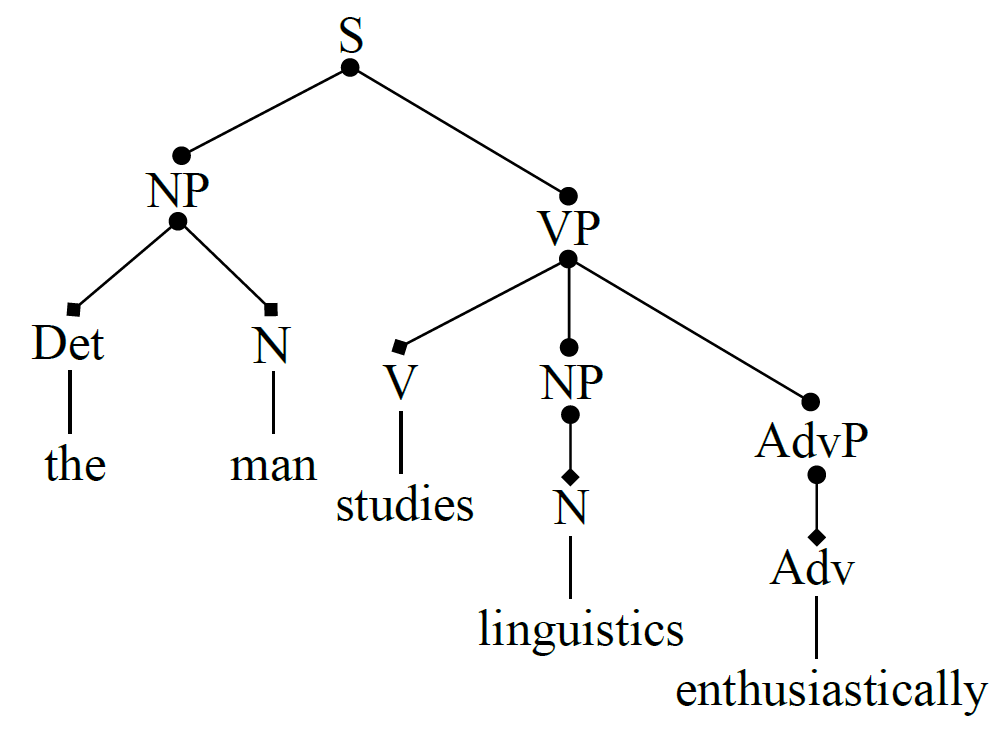
Figure 1

All the points illustrated by circles and diamonds are nodes in Figure 1, and the former are called nonterminal nodes and the latter terminal nodes. Note that the PSR does not specify how a node branches because the parent (the left side of the arrow) can diverge into any number of daughters (the right side of the arrow); thus, a node under the PSR can branch into any number of different nodes, allowing non-branching, binary-branching, ternary-branching, and so forth.

== Nodes under the X-bar theory ==
If we illustrate the structure of the sentence above in accordance with the X-bar schema, we obtain the structure in Figure 2 (Note: In Figure 2, we assume that clauses have an endocentric structure and are tense phrases (TPs) headed by the functional head T, following Pollock (1989) and Chomsky (1995).) (Note: In Figure 2, we assume that noun phrases are determiner phrases (DPs) headed by the functional head D, following Abney (1987).) (Note: For convenience sake, we ignore the VP-Internal Subject Hypothesis in Figure 2.).

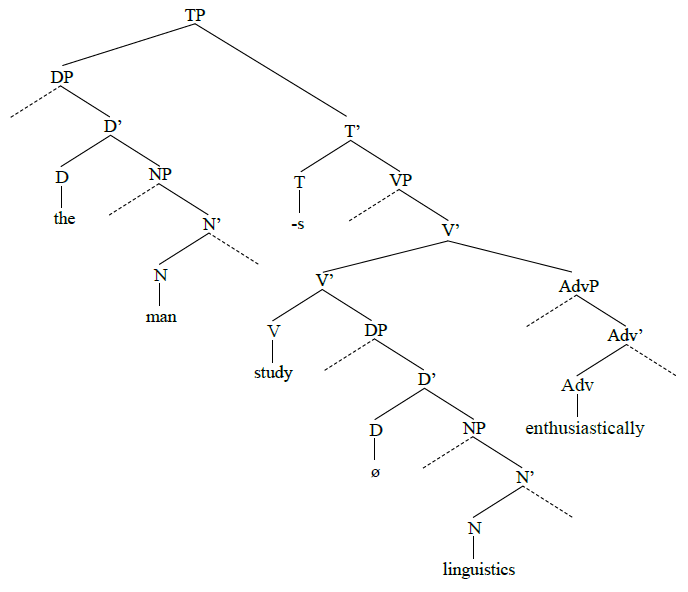
Figure 2

Under the X-bar theory, a node necessarily divides into two branches because of the binarity principle. This also means that zero-level projections (heads) serve as terminal nodes and intermediate and maximal projections as nonterminal nodes.

== Nodes under the minimalist program ==
Under the minimalist program, syntactic structures are formed by iterative applications of the syntactic operation Merge, which serves to connect two elements into one. To yield a linguistic expression, lexemes are selected out of the lexicon and make a (non-ordered) set of syntactic objects called a lexical array, and a structure is derived by combining two of the objects (or combined objects) by Merge. In the case of the sentence The man studies linguistics enthusiastically, for example, the lexical array consists of {the, man, PRES, study, linguistics, enthusiastically}. When these syntactic objects are combined by Merge, that yields the structure in Figure 3.

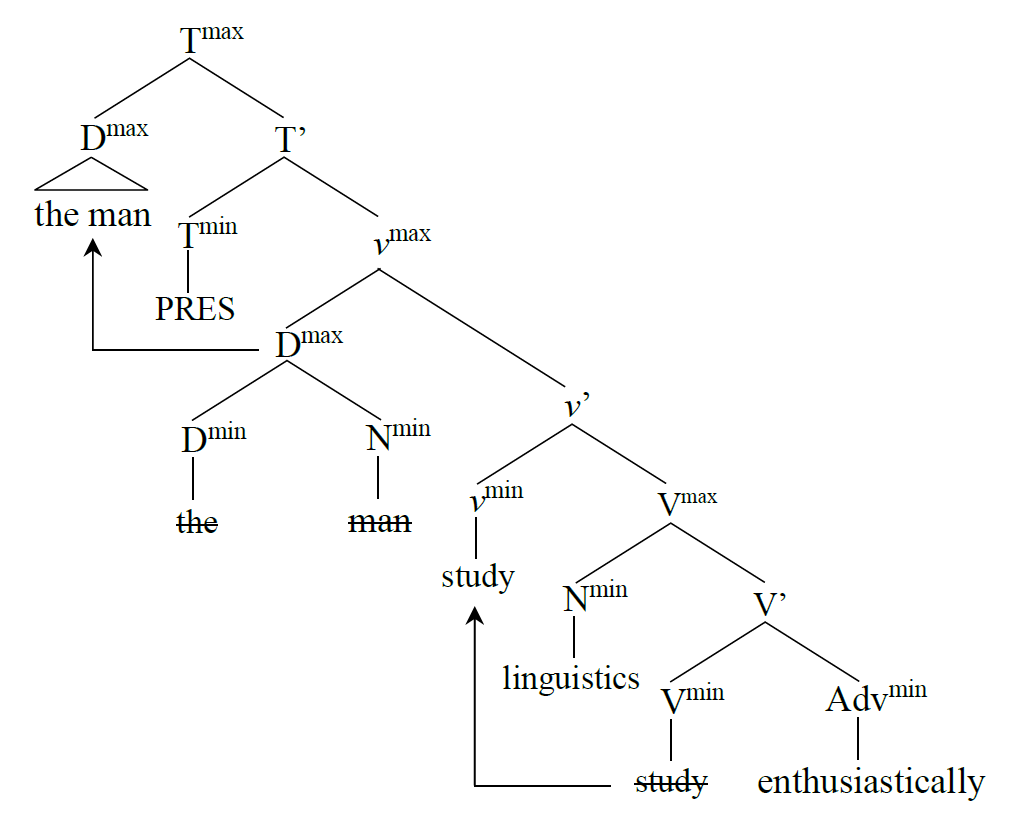
Figure 3

Since Merge is an operation that combines two elements, a node under the Minimalist Program needs to be binary just as in the X-bar theory, although there is a difference between the theories in that under the X-bar theory, the directionality of branching is fixed in accordance with the principles-and-parameters model (not with the X-bar theory itself), or more specifically, with the head parameter. (This means that the X-bar theory indirectly assumes that speakers have in their Universal Grammar a rule that determines the canonical linear order for them, depending on their native language.) On the other hand, under the Minimalist Program, there is no such canonical fundamentals since the lexical array does not constitute an ordered set. For this reason, linear order under the Minimalist Program is determined by the phonological operation of linearization applied to the partial string called a phase (under the Phase Theory) that is sent out to PF by Transfer.

== Related topics ==
- linguistics
- syntax
- generative grammar
- constituent
- syntactic tree
- phrase structure rule
- X-bar theory
- Minimalist Program
