= Non-configurational language =

Concept in theoretical linguistics

- Type: Linguistic typology
- Field: Syntax
- Introduced by: Ken Hale
- Introduced in: 1980s
- Examples: Warlpiri, Mohawk, Nahuatl, O'odham, Jingulu, Jiwarli
- Key features: Free word order, pro-drop, discontinuous expressions
- Related concepts: Configurational language, Dependency grammar
- Notes: Contrasts with configurational languages in phrase structure

In generative grammar, non-configurational languages are languages characterized by a flat phrase structure, which allows syntactically discontinuous expressions, and a relatively free word order.

== History of the concept of "non-configurationality" ==
The concept of non-configurationality was developed by grammarians working within Noam Chomsky's generative framework. Some of these linguists observed that the Syntactic Universals proposed by Chomsky and which required a rigid phrase structure were challenged by the syntax of some of the world's languages that had a much less rigid syntax than that of the languages on which Chomsky had based his studies. The concept was invented by Ken Hale who described the syntax of Warlpiri as being non-configurational. However, the first to publish a description of non-configurationality was Chomsky himself in his 1981 lectures on Government and Binding, in which he referred to an unpublished paper by Hale. Chomsky made it a goal of the Government and Binding framework to accommodate languages such as Japanese and Warlpiri that apparently did not conform to his proposed language universal of Move α. Hale later published his own description of non-configurationality in Warlpiri.

== Distinction ==
Non-configurational languages contrast with configurational languages, where the subject of a sentence is outside the finite verb phrase (VP) (directly under S below) but the object is inside it. Since there is no VP constituent in non-configurational languages, there is no structural difference between subject and object. The distinction — configurational versus non-configurational — can exist in phrase structure grammars only. In a dependency-based grammar, the distinction is meaningless because dependency-based structures do not acknowledge a finite VP constituent.

The following trees illustrate the distinction:

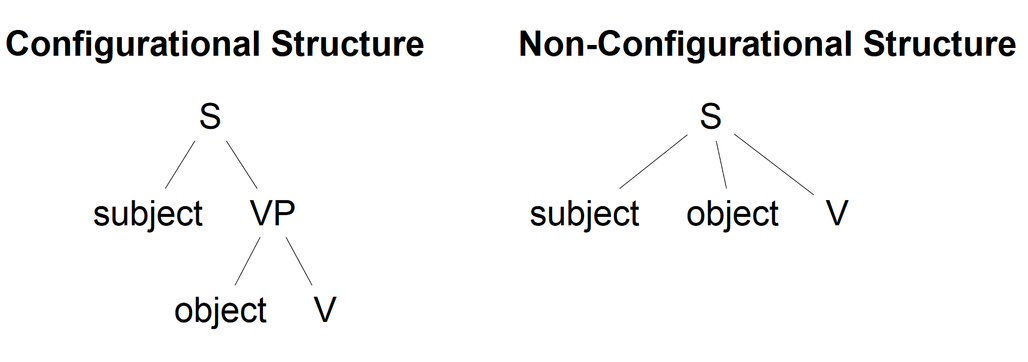

Non-configurational languages have a seemingly 'flat' constituent structure, as illustrated above. The presence of the VP constituent in the configurational tree on the left allows one to define the syntactic relations (subject vs. object) in terms of configuration: the subject is the argument that appears outside of the VP, but the object appears inside it. The flat structure on the right, where there is no VP, forces/allows one to view aspects of syntax differently. More generally, Hale proposed that non-configurational languages have the following characteristics:

1. free (or more accurately, pragmatically determined) word order
2. extensive use of null anaphora (pro-drop phenomena)
3. syntactically discontinuous expressions

However, it is not clear that those properties all cluster together. Languages that have been described as non-configurational include Mohawk, Warlpiri, Nahuatl, O'odham (Papago), Jingulu, and Jiwarli.

== Discourse-configurationality ==
Using non-configurationality as a model, Maria Vilkuna coined and Katalin Kiss developed the concept of discourse-configurationality to describe languages where constituent order is primarily determined by pragmatic factors. Non-configurationality and discourse-configurationality are mutually independent.

The Oxford Handbook of Information Structure defines "discourse-configurational" as referring to "languages in which a particular phrase structure configuration is systematically and exclusively associated with some Information Structure category falling under the notions of Topic and Focus." Those associated with Topic status are more specifically called "topic-configurational," while those associated with Focus status are called "focus-configurational."

Hungarian is discourse-configurational.

== Non-configurational languages ==
=== Warlpiri ===
Warlpiri is a language of the large Pama-Nyungan language family and is spoken in Central Australia by more than 3000 people. It has four main dialects: Yuendumu Warlpiri, Willowra Warlpiri, Lajamanu Warlpiri, and Wakirti Warlpiri, which are spoken across the region. It displays the three main characteristics of non-configurationality, namely free word order, extensive use of null anaphora, and discontinuous expressions.

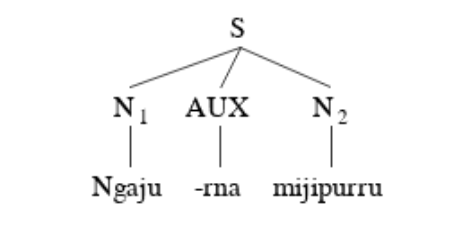
This tree shows the basic sentence structure of Warlpiri sentences.

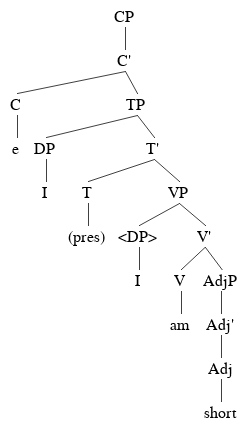
This tree shows the basic sentence structure of English sentences.

According to Hale, the relatively unconstrained manner in which words are ordered within the sentence is due to the way in which the projection principle acts in non-configurational languages. Hale's Configurationality Parameter (CP) holds that, in non-configurational languages, the projection principle holds of only lexical structure (LS). This is in contrast to configurational languages, where CP states that the projection principle holds of both phrasal structure (PS) and lexical structure. According to Hale, it is the lack of relation between lexical structure (LS) and phrase structure (PS) of sentences in Warlpiri that permits the three characteristics of non-configurationality to be present:

1. Free word order within Warlpiri is due to three properties of the language: word position within the sentence can be assigned freely, pronominal clitics within the auxiliary verbs provide information about their functions, and argument-taking predicates include their case marking within their lexical entries.
2. Concerning the possibility of null anaphora, the subject of an infinitive is allowed to be marked as anaphoric. However, the subject argument of lexical structure cannot be marked as anaphoric, because it cannot be bound and therefore would violate Principle A of Binding Theory.
3. Discontinuous expressions are permitted in Warlpiri because non-adjacent nominals are able to correspond to a single verbal (AUX) argument. This means that the DP and the NP can be referring to the same verb, but are not beside each other in the sentence.

The major (lexical) categories of Warlpiri include N, V, and PV (pro-verb) and the minor (functional) categories include AUX (verbs) and particles, conjunctions, and clitics, which are all part of the category Particles. The general Warlpiri sentence phrase structure is as follows:

S --> (AUX) α α* (with α = N, V, or particle)

Pronominals are freely ordered with respect to the other words in the sentence, and behave as other nominals do. This is in contrast to the sentence structure of a configurational language, such as English, with a basic sentence phrase structure following:

S --> NP VP.

Warlpiri verbs are always argument-taking predicates and Warlpiri nominals are always arguments or argument-taking predicates. This is shown in the tree structure to the right of ngaju-rna mijipurru ("I am short") in Warlpiri, with the nominals ngaju ("I") and mijipurru ("short") acting as either an argument-taking predicate or argument, depending on the category of the AUX -rna ("am"). In this sentence, the AUX is first person singular, indicating that ngaju must act as an argument and that mijipurru must act as an argument-taking predicate in order for the sentence to be grammatical in Warlpiri. In English, the DP "I" is the argument and the adjective "short" is the argument-taking predicate. The trees to the right show the differences between configurational and non-configurational languages, with an example tree from Warlpiri compared with an example tree from English.

== Case-based analysis: Jelinek ==
Hale (1980, 1981, 1982, 1983) aimed to define a configurationality parameter from which the clusters of properties in non-configurational languages would follow. Eloise Jelinek challenges Hale, providing a re-analysis of Walpiri and certain other non-configurational languages, proposes a different parameter. Mainly Jelinek provides an analysis for why nominals are frequently 'absent' in Warlpiri (null anaphora). Following the Government Binding Theory, the projection principle prevents missing nominals, instead there are empty heads that bear relevant thematic roles, in other words the nominal is recoverable. Hale stipulates that nominals in non-configurational languages are simply optional, which is a result of the nature of the relationship between phrase structure and lexical structure in non-configurational languages. However Jelinek proposes configurationally parameters that are in agreement with the projection principle, with specific reference to Warlpiri data. It is proposed that the AUX not only marks grammatical relations but it also a constituent containing case marked fully referential clitic pronouns that serve as verbal arguments. Since nominals are never verb arguments they can be omitted, without violating the projection principle.

Subsequently, Jelinek explains the free word order and apparent discontinuous expressions of non-configurational languages. Since nominals are not related to arguments, more than one nominal may be adjoined to a single argument thus yielding discontinuous expressions. Additionally because nominals act as adjuncts, they are not required to have a fixed word order. Following this, the function of nominals in non-configurational languages is, similar to adjoined clauses, to add more information to the verbal argument or the predicate.

== Mark Baker's application of non-configurationality to polysynthetic languages ==
Linguist Mark Baker considers polysynthesis, making specific use of Mohawk, to provide a conception of Universal Grammar which accurately accounts for both polysynthetic languages and non-polysynthetic languages. He asserts that the polysynthetic languages must conform to a syntactic rule he calls the "polysynthesis parameter", and that as a result will show a special set of syntactic properties. Following this parameter, one property of polysynthetic languages is non-rigid phrase structure, making these languages non-configurational. To support his claim he considers three features of non-configurationality: the position of NPs, the licensing of NPs and discontinuous constituents.

=== Position of NPs ===
In non-configurational languages any NP can be omitted and can appear in an order relative to the verb or other NPs. Baker proposes polysynthetic languages follow this structure as NPs appear to have the properties of adjuncts. To take an example of an English parallel, adverbs are modifiers and can appear on either side of the VP, Baker applies this familiar concept to a new domain, showing that in Mohawk (a polysynthetic language), like English the VP has an obligatory position but NPs can be adjuncts with respect to this element.

=== Licensing of NPs ===
As discussed above, Baker proposes that in polysynthetic languages NPs do not take the argument position, he hence suggest there is another parameter which forces NPs into the adjoined position. He suggests this licensing occurs as a result of the Adjunct Licensing Condition, and following this, the Chain Condition. The Adjunct Licensing Condition states that an argument type phrase XP generated in the adjoined positions licensed if and only if it forms a chain with a unique null pronominal in an argument position. The Chain Condition states that X and Y may form a chain only under certain conditions. Namely, X c-commands Y, X and Y are coindexed, there is no barrier containing Y but not X and X and Y are non distinct in morphosyntactic features.

=== Discontinuous Constituents ===
Baker also considers Hale proposed third element of non-configurationality: the existence of discontinuous expressions. The range of discontinuous expressions of a polysynthetic language is determined primarily by lexical factors. This suggests that a language that allows a wider range of discontinuous expressions perhaps has more ways of licensing NP expressions.

In considering polysynthesis through the framework of non-configurationality, Mark Baker is able to provide basis for the unique syntax seen in polysynthetic languages. Mark Baker's approach to polysythesis creates some debate among linguists as it heavily relies on generative grammar, which causes some languages which would traditionally be considered to be polysynthetic to be excluded.

== Controversy amongst phrase structure grammars ==
The analysis of non-configurational languages has been controversial among phrase structure grammars. On the one hand, much work on these languages in Principles and Parameters has attempted to show that they are in fact configurational. On the other hand, it has been argued in Lexical Functional Grammar that these attempts are flawed, and that truly non-configurational languages exist. From the perspective of syntactic theory, the existence of non-configurational languages bears on the question of whether grammatical functions like subject and object are independent of structure. If they are not, no language can be truly non-configurational.

== Controversy with dependency grammars ==
The distinction between configurational and non-configurational languages can exist for phrase structure grammars only. Dependency grammars (DGs), since they lack a finite VP constituent altogether, do not acknowledge the distinction. In other words, all languages are non-configurational for DGs, even English, which all phrase structure grammars take for granted as having a finite VP constituent. The point is illustrated with the following examples:

No structure will have a finite VP constituent. - Finite VP in bold
No structure will have a finite VP constituent. - Non-finite VP in bold

Phrase structure grammars almost unanimously assume that the finite VP in bold in the first sentence is a constituent. DGs, in contrast, do not see finite VPs as constituents. Both phrase structure grammars and DGs do, however, see non-finite VPs as constituents. The dependency structure of the example sentence is as follows:

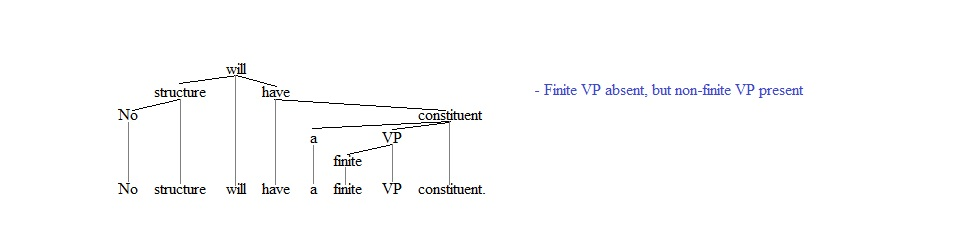

Since the finite VP will have a finite VP constituent does not qualify as a complete subtree, it is not a constituent. What this means based upon the criterion of configurationality is that this dependency structure (like all dependency structures) is non-configurational. The distinction between configurational and non-configurational has hence disappeared entirely, all languages being non-configurational in the relevant sense. Note, however, that while the finite VP is not a constituent in the tree, the non-finite VP have a finite VP constituent is a constituent (because it qualifies as a complete subtree).

Dependency grammars point to the results of standard constituency tests as evidence that finite VP does not exist as a constituent While these tests deliver clear evidence for the existence of a non-finite VP constituent in English (and other languages), they do not do the same for finite VP.

== See also ==
- Constituent (linguistics)
- Dependency grammar
- Finite verb
- Phrase structure grammar
- Non-finite verb
- Verb phrase
- Endocentric and exocentric
