= Praegnans constructio =

In rhetoric, praegnans constructio (or constructio praegnans) is a form of brachylogy in which two clauses or two expressions are condensed into one. The term comes from the Latin term of the same name, which translates to pregnant construction. Generally, the construction involves a sentence which uses a verb not expressing motion being followed by a prepositional phrase that does express motion, such as slaughter into the fire, or - alternatively - a motion verb combined with a static prepositional phrase such as those who came over on the island were lost. The construction is most commonly found in Greek, but also can be found in a handful of other languages such as Hebrew.
