= Bahuvrihi =

Sanskrit term for "headless" or exocentric compound

A bahuvrīhi (Sanskrit: बहुव्रीहि, romanized: bahuvrīhi, lit. 'having much rice'), or bahuvrīhi compound, is a type of compound word that denotes a referent by specifying a certain characteristic or quality the referent possesses. A bahuvrihi is exocentric, so that the compound is not a hyponym of its head. For instance, a sabretooth (smil-odon) is neither a sabre nor a tooth, but a feline with sabre-like teeth.

In Sanskrit bahuvrihis, the last part is a noun—more strictly, a nominal stem—while the whole compound is an adjective. In Vedic Sanskrit the accent is regularly on the first member (tatpurusha rāja-pútra "a king's son", but bahuvrihi rājá-putra "having kings as sons" (lit. king-sons), viz. rājá-putra-, m., "father of kings", rājá-putrā-, f., "mother of kings"), with the exception of a number of non-nominal prefixes such as the privative a; the word bahuvrīhí is itself likewise an exception to this rule.

Bahuvrihi compounds are called possessive compounds in English. In English, bahuvrihis can be identified and the last constituent is usually a noun, while the whole compound is a noun or an adjective. The accent is on the first constituent. English bahuvrihis often describe people using synecdoche: flatfoot, half-wit, highbrow, lowlife, redhead, tenderfoot, long-legs, and white-collar.

In dictionaries and other reference works, the abbreviation "Bhvr." is sometimes used to indicate bahuvrihi compounds.

== Etymology ==
Bahuvrihi is from Sanskrit: बहुव्रीहि, romanized: bahuvrīhi, lit. 'having much rice', originally referring to fertile land but later denoting the quality of being wealthy or rich.

== Examples ==
=== English ===
- "Houndstooth", a woven fabric with a patterns resembling dog's teeth: "She's wearing houndstooth."
- "Old money", members from established upper-class who have usually inherited their wealth: "He's definitely old money."
- "Bluestocking", an educated, intellectual, or artistically accomplished woman: "Auntie Maud will never marry; she's a bluestocking."
- White-collar and blue-collar labor, referring to common colors of uniforms of clerks and workmen respectively c. early 20th century.
- "Redhead" refers to a ginger haired person.

=== Other languages ===
- Skinfaxi and Hrímfaxi (meaning shining-mane and rime-mane; two horses in Norse mythology) are two examples of Old Norse bahuvrihis.
- Haxāmaniš

== See also ==
- Dvandva
- Sanskrit compound#Dvigu-bahuvrīhi and Sanskrit compound#Dvigu-tatpuruṣa (numerative)
- Kenning
- Makurakotoba
- Sanskrit compound
- Synecdoche
