= Phrase =

Group of one or more words

In linguistics, a phrase — called an expression in some contexts — is a group of one or more words acting as a grammatical unit. For instance, the English sentence "the squirrel is very happy" is a clause phrase which contains the noun phrase "the squirrel" and the verb phrase "is very happy". Additionally, "very happy" is an adjective phrase. Phrases can consist of a single word or a complete sentence. In theoretical linguistics, phrases are often analyzed as units of syntactic structure, such as constituents. The common use of the term phrase is different from its technical use in linguistics. In common usage, a phrase is usually a group of words with some special idiomatic meaning or other significance, such as "all rights reserved", "economical with the truth", or "kick the bucket" – it may be a euphemism, a saying or proverb, a fixed expression, a figure of speech, etc. In linguistics, these are referred to as phrasemes.

== Phrase trees ==
Many theories of syntax and grammar illustrate sentence structure using phrase 'trees', which provide schematics of how the words in a sentence are grouped and relate to each other. A tree shows the words, phrases, and clauses that make up a sentence. Any word combination that corresponds to a complete subtree can be seen as a phrase.

There are two competing principles for constructing trees; they produce 'constituency' and 'dependency' trees and both are illustrated here using an example sentence. The constituency-based tree is on the left and the dependency-based tree is on the right (where adjective (A), determiner (D), noun (N), sentence (S), verb (V), noun phrase (NP), prepositional phrase (PP), verb phrase (VP)):

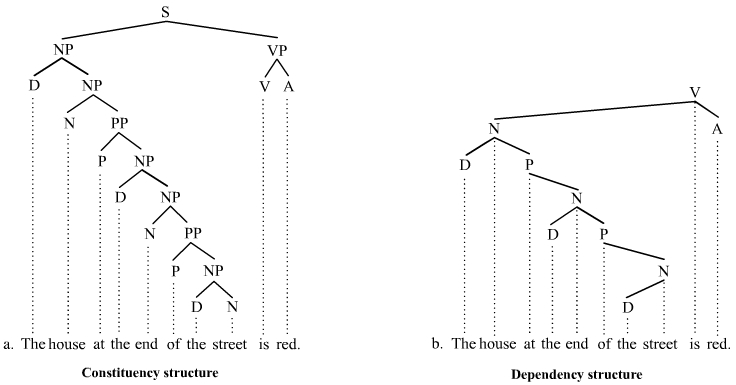

The tree on the left is of the constituency-based, phrase structure grammar, and the tree on the right is of the dependency grammar. The node labels in the two trees mark the syntactic category of the different constituents, or word elements, of the sentence.

In the constituency tree each phrase is marked by a phrasal node (NP, PP, VP); and there are eight phrases identified by phrase structure analysis in the example sentence. On the other hand, the dependency tree identifies a phrase by any node that exerts dependency upon, or dominates, another node. And, using dependency analysis, there are six phrases in the sentence.

The trees and phrase-counts demonstrate that different theories of syntax differ in the word combinations they qualify as a phrase. Here the constituency tree identifies three phrases that the dependency trees does not, namely: house at the end of the street, end of the street, and the end. More analysis, including about the plausibilities of both grammars, can be made empirically by applying constituency tests.

== Heads and dependents ==
In grammatical analysis, most phrases contain a head, which identifies the type and linguistic features of the phrase. The syntactic category of the head is used to name the category of the phrase; for example, a phrase whose head is a noun is called a noun phrase. The remaining words in a phrase are called the dependents of the head.

In the following phrases the head-word, or head, is bolded:

too slowly — Adverb phrase (AdvP); the head is an adverb
very happy — Adjective phrase (AP); the head is an adjective
the massive dinosaur — Noun phrase (NP); the head is a noun (but see below for the determiner phrase analysis)
at lunch — Preposition phrase (PP); the head is a preposition
watch TV — Verb phrase (VP); the head is a verb

The above five examples are the most common of phrase types; but, by the logic of heads and dependents, others can be routinely produced. For instance, the subordinator phrase:

before that happened — Subordinator phrase (SP); the head is a subordinating conjunction—it subordinates the independent clause

By linguistic analysis this is a group of words that qualifies as a phrase, and the head-word gives its syntactic name, "subordinator", to the grammatical category of the entire phrase. But this phrase, "before that happened", is more commonly classified in other grammars, including traditional English grammars, as a subordinate clause (or dependent clause); and it is then labelled not as a phrase, but as a clause.

Most theories of syntax view most phrases as having a head, but some non-headed phrases are acknowledged. A phrase lacking a head is known as exocentric, and phrases with heads are endocentric.

=== Functional categories ===
Some modern theories of syntax introduce functional categories in which the head of a phrase is a functional lexical item. Some functional heads in some languages are not pronounced, but are rather covert. For example, in order to explain certain syntactic patterns which correlate with the speech act a sentence performs, some researchers have posited force phrases (ForceP), whose heads are not pronounced in many languages including English. Similarly, many frameworks assume that covert determiners are present in bare noun phrases such as proper names.

Another type is the inflectional phrase, where (for example) a finite verb phrase is taken to be the complement of a functional, possibly covert head (denoted INFL) which is supposed to encode the requirements for the verb to inflect – for agreement with its subject (which is the specifier of INFL), for tense and aspect, etc. If these factors are treated separately, then more specific categories may be considered: tense phrase (TP), where the verb phrase is the complement of an abstract "tense" element; aspect phrase; agreement phrase and so on.

Further examples of such proposed categories include topic phrase and focus phrase, which are argued to be headed by elements that encode the need for a constituent of the sentence to be marked as the topic or focus.

== Variation among theories of syntax ==
Theories of syntax differ in what they regard as a phrase. For instance, while most if not all theories of syntax acknowledge the existence of verb phrases (VPs), Phrase structure grammars acknowledge both finite verb phrases and non-finite verb phrases while dependency grammars only acknowledge non-finite verb phrases. The split between these views persists due to conflicting results from the standard empirical diagnostics of phrasehood such as constituency tests.

The distinction is illustrated with the following examples:

The Republicans may nominate Newt. - Finite VP in bold
The Republicans may nominate Newt. - Non-finite VP in bold

The syntax trees of this sentence are next:

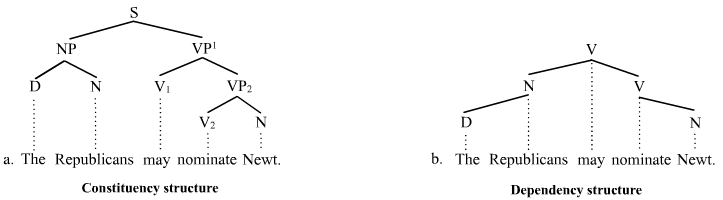

The constituency tree on the left shows the finite verb string may nominate Newt as a constituent; it corresponds to VP_{1}. In contrast, this same string is not shown as a phrase in the dependency tree on the right. However, both trees, take the non-finite VP string nominate Newt to be a constituent.

== See also ==
- Clause
- Constituent (linguistics)
- Dependency grammar
- Finite verb
- Head (linguistics)
- Non-finite verb
- Phrase structure grammar
- Sentence (linguistics)
- Syntactic category
- Verb phrase
- Phraseme
- X-bar theory
