= Plato's problem =

Philosophical problem

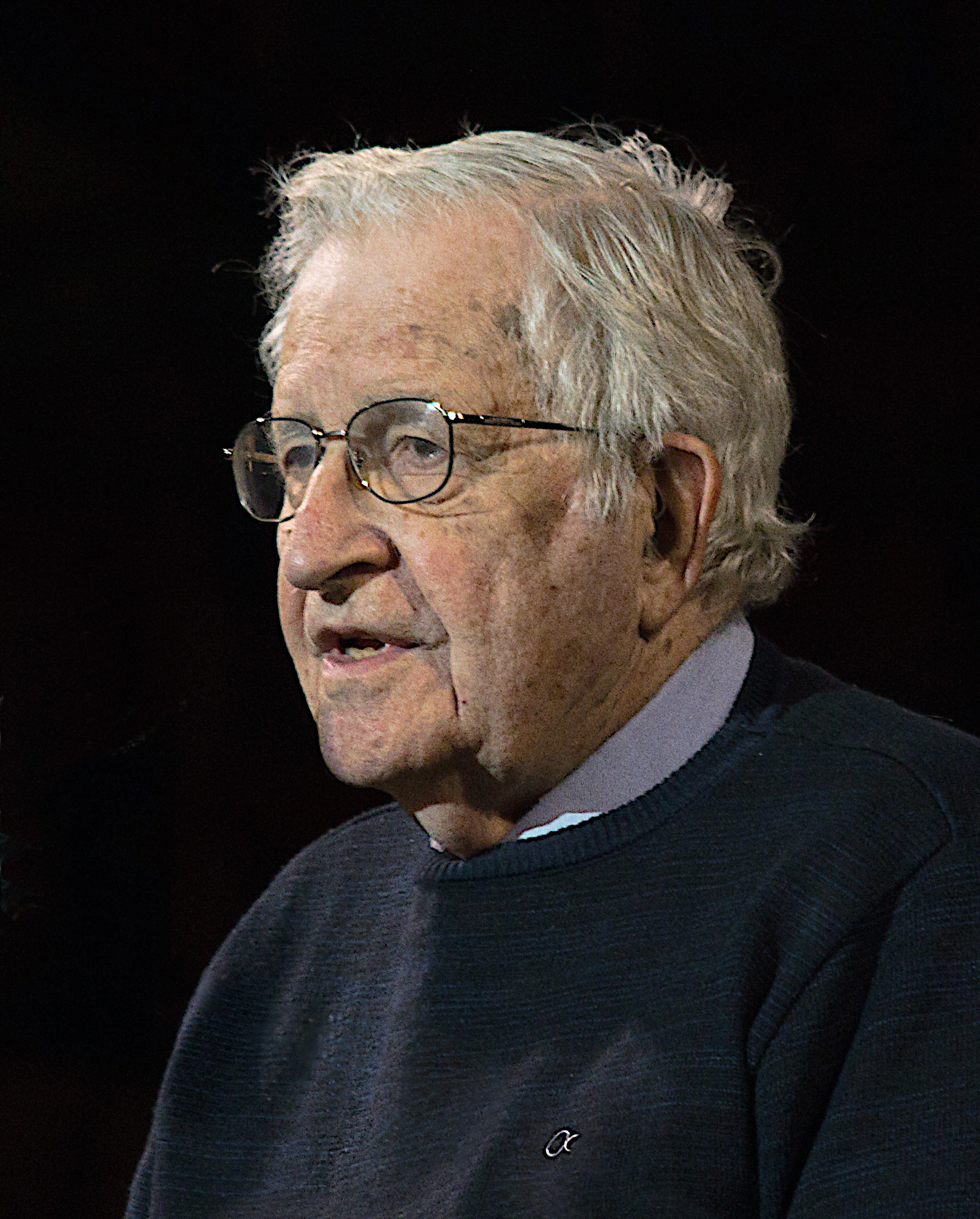
Noam Chomsky posed Plato's problem.

Plato's problem is the term given by Noam Chomsky to "the problem of explaining how we can know so much" given our limited experience. Chomsky believes that Plato asked (using modern terms) how we should account for the rich, intrinsic, common structure of human cognition, when it seems underdetermined by extrinsic evidence presented to a person during human development. In linguistics this is referred to as the "argument from poverty of the stimulus" (APS). Such arguments are common in the natural sciences, where a developing theory is always "underdetermined by evidence". Chomsky's approach to Plato's problem involves treating cognition as a normal research topic in the natural sciences, so cognition can be studied to elucidate intertwined genetic, developmental, and biophysical factors. Plato's problem is most clearly illustrated in the Meno dialogue, in which Socrates demonstrates that an uneducated boy nevertheless understands geometric principles.
