= Adjective phrase =

Type of phrase

An adjective phrase (or adjectival phrase) is a phrase whose head is an adjective. This definition is standard across grammar and syntax textbooks and dictionaries of linguistic terminology. The adjective can initiate the phrase (e.g. fond of steak), conclude the phrase (e.g. very happy), or appear in a medial position (e.g. quite upset about it). The dependents of the head adjective—i.e. the other words and phrases inside the adjective phrase—are typically adverb or prepositional phrases, but they can also be clauses (e.g. louder than you are). Adjectives and adjective phrases function in two basic ways, attributively or predicatively. An attributive adjective (phrase) precedes the noun of a noun phrase (e.g. a very happy man). A predicative adjective (phrase) follows a linking verb and serves to describe the preceding subject, e.g. The man is very happy.

== Attributive vs. predicative ==
The adjective phrases are underlined in the following example sentences. The head adjective in each of these phrases is in bold, and how the adjective phrase is functioning—attributively or predicatively—is stated to the right of each example:

1. Sentences can contain tremendously **long** phrases. – Attributive adjective phrase
2. This sentence is not tremendously **long**. – Predicative adjective phrase
3. A player **faster** than you was on their team gaining weight. – Attributive adjective phrase
4. He is **faster** than you. – Predicative adjective phrase
5. Sam ordered a very **spicy** but quite **small** pizza. – Attributive adjective phrases
6. The pizza is very **spicy** but quite **small**. – Predicative adjective phrases
7. The people, **angry** because of the high prices, were protesting. – Attributive adjective phrase
8. The people are **angry** with the high prices. – Predicative adjective phrase

The distinguishing characteristic of an attributive adjective phrase is that it appears inside the noun phrase that it modifies. An interesting trait of these phrases in English is that an attributive adjective alone generally precedes the noun, e.g. a proud man, whereas a head-initial or head-medial adjective phrase follows its noun, e.g. a man proud of his children. A predicative adjective (phrase), in contrast, appears outside of the noun phrase that it describes, usually after a linking verb, e.g. The man is proud of his children.

== Adjective vs. adjectival ==
There is a tendency to call a phrase an adjectival phrase when that phrase is functioning like an adjective phrase, but is not actually headed by an adjective. For example, in Mr Clinton is a man of wealth, the prepositional phrase of wealth modifies a man in a manner similar to how an adjective phrase would, and it can be reworded with an adjective, e.g. Mr Clinton is a wealthy man. A more accurate term for such cases is phrasal attributive or attributive phrase.

== Constituency tests ==
Constituency tests can also be used to identify adjectives and adjective phrases. Here are the three constituency tests, according to X-bar theory, that prove the adjective phrase is both a constituent, and an AP.

In the following tests, consider the sentence: Sam ordered a very spicy pizza.

1. Coordination tests can be used to confirm if very spicy is an adjective phrase.
  Sam ordered a very spicy (and/but) quite small pizza. (Sam ordered a AP and AP pizza)
  This phrase passed the coordination test because it was grammatical, and the adjective phrases were not creating ambiguous meanings when a conjunction (and/but) is used.
2. Ellipsis tests can also be used to confirm if very spicy is an adjective phrase.
  Sam ordered a very spicy pizza, but the pizza Betty ordered was not ~~very spicy~~.
  This phrase passed the Ellipsis test, because no ambiguity is created and the adjective phrase could be elided (deleted).
3. A movement test, specifically pseudoclefting, can be used to confirm if very spicy is an adjective phrase.
  Sam ordered a ~~very spicy~~ pizza that was very spicy.
  Movement tests not only prove that the constituent moved is a stand-alone constituent, but also proves that this phrase very spicy is an AP if drawn in a syntax tree. Thus, because this adjective phrase could be moved to the right (pseudocleft), it's sufficient proof that it is both a constituent and an adjective phrase.

== Semantic ambiguity ==
Although constituency tests can prove the existence of an AP in a sentence, the meanings of these AP may be ambiguous. This ambiguity must be considered when considering the semantic versus pragmatic meaning. The following examples prove two things:

1. Adjective phrases that are pre-nominal create ambiguous interpretations.
2. Head adjectives that move to post-nominal position creates unambiguous interpretations.

Note: This section can be added into the adjectives page, but ambiguity can also apply to adjective phrases. Additionally, comma placements and intonations may have a role in figuring out ambiguity, but English has a written form of communication that is more ambiguous than spoken communication.

The following examples show the different interpretive properties of pre- and post-nominal adjectives which are inside adjective phrases.

=== Intersective versus non-intersective interpretation of AP ===
1. Ambiguous sentence: I've never met a more beautiful dancer than Mary
  1. Intersective: I've never met a dancer who is more beautiful (as a person) than Mary
  2. Non-intersective: I've never met anyone dancing more beautifully than Mary
2. Unambiguous sentence: I've never met a dancer more beautiful than Mary
  1. Intersective: I've never met a dancer who is more beautiful (as a person) than Mary
  2. *Non-intersective: *I've never met anyone dancing more beautifully than Mary

This example showed then entire adjective phrase moving, creating the same ambiguity as example 1. Therefore, the placement of the adjective relative to the subject is important for creating unambiguous statements.

=== Restrictive versus non-restrictive interpretation of AP ===
1. Ambiguous sentence: All the short blessed people were healed.
  1. Non-restrictive: All the short people were healed
  2. Restrictive: Only the people that were short and blessed were healed
2. Unambiguous sentence: All the short people blessed were healed.
  1. *Non-restrictive: All the people were healed (* = not possible for this interpretation)
  2. Restrictive: All the people that were short and blessed were healed

The adjective blessed is ambiguous in pre-nominal position because it creates a restrictive and a nonrestrictive interpretation (a), while in post-nominal position it only displays a restrictive interpretation (b). Plus, when the main adjective of the adjective phrase is moved to post-nominal position, only one interpretation is possible.

There is cross-linguistic validity, according to the multiple articles referenced in Cinque's article, which studied this adjective placement in Italian as well. Cinque discovered that exactly the same pattern was seen in Italian, because ambiguous interpretations only appeared when the adjective phrase was placed in pre-nominal position. Next, other research articles also confirm that this word order phenomenon exists in Mandarin Chinese, creating ambiguous interpretations. For example, an adjective phrase with the head adjective private in pre-object position, creates two interpretations. On the other hand, an adjective phrase with the head adjective private placed in post-object position only creates one interpretation.

== Tree diagram representations ==
The structure of adjective phrases (and of all other phrase types) can be represented using tree structures. There are two modern conventions for doing this, constituency-based trees of phrase structure grammars and dependency-based trees of dependency grammars. Both types of trees are produced here. The important aspect of these tree structures—regardless of whether one uses constituency or dependency to show the structure of phrases—is that they are identified as adjective phrases by the label on the top node of each tree.

=== Head-final adjective phrases ===
The following trees illustrate head-final adjective phrases, i.e. adjective phrases that have their head adjective on the right side of the phrase:

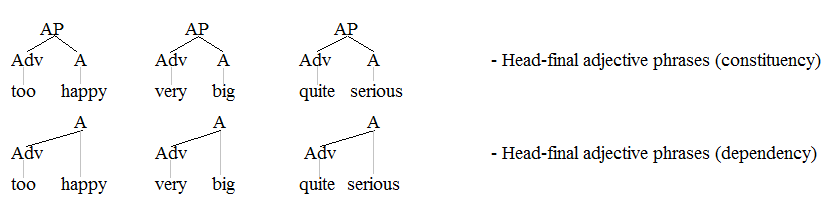

The labels on the nodes in the trees are acronyms: A = adjective, Adv = adverb, AP = adjective phrase, N = noun/pronoun, P = preposition, PP = prepositional phrase. The constituency trees identify these phrases as adjective phrases by labeling the top node with AP, and the dependency trees accomplish the same thing by positioning the A node at the top of the tree.

=== Head-initial adjective phrases ===
The following trees illustrate the structure of head-initial adjective phrases, i.e. adjective phrases that have their head on the left side of the phrase:

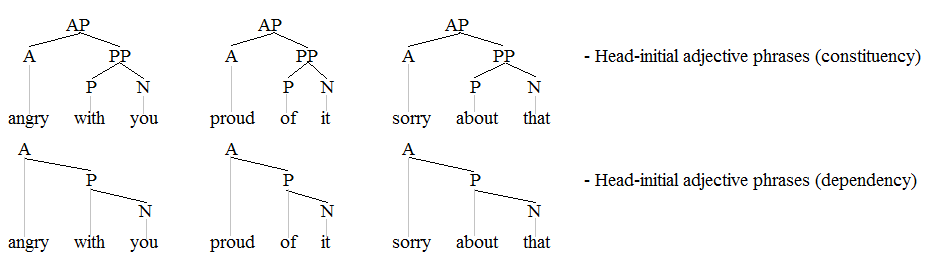

=== Head-medial adjective phrases ===
The following trees illustrate the structure of head-medial adjective phrases:

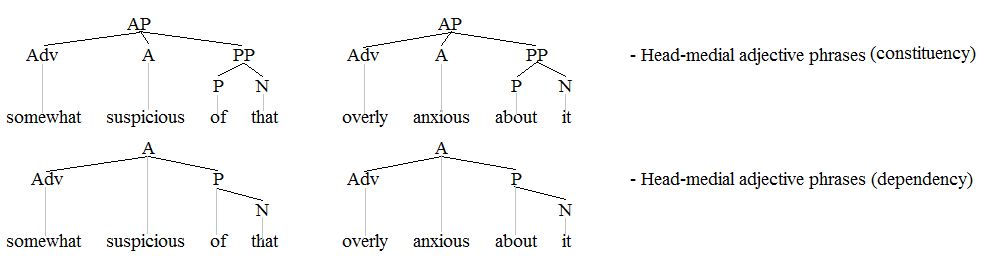
