= Adpositional phrase =

Phrase modifying a lexical item

An adpositional phrase is a syntactic category that includes prepositional phrases, postpositional phrases, and circumpositional phrases. Adpositional phrases contain an adposition (preposition, postposition, or circumposition) as head and usually a complement such as a noun phrase. Language syntax treats adpositional phrases as units that act as arguments or adjuncts. Prepositional and postpositional phrases differ by the order of the words used. Languages that are primarily head-initial such as English predominantly use prepositional phrases whereas head-final languages predominantly employ postpositional phrases. Many languages have both types, as well as circumpositional phrases.

== Types ==
There are three types of adpositional phrases: prepositional phrases, postpositional phrases, and circumpositional phrases.

=== Prepositional phrases ===
The underlined phrases in the following sentences are examples of prepositional phrases in English. The prepositions are in bold:

a. She walked to his desk.

b. Ryan could see her in the room.

c. David walked on top of the building.

d. They walked up the stairs.

e. Philip ate in the kitchen.

f. Charlotte walked inside the house.

g. As a student, I find that offensive.

Prepositional phrases have a preposition as the central element of the phrase, i.e. as the head of the phrase. The remaining part of the phrase is called the prepositional complement, or sometimes the "object" of the preposition. In English and many other Indo-European languages it takes the form of a noun phrase, such as a noun, pronoun, or gerund, possibly with one or more modifiers.

A prepositional phrase can function as an adjective or adverb.

=== Postpositional phrases ===
Postpositional elements are frequent in head-final languages such as Basque, Estonian, Finnish, Georgian, Korean, Japanese, Hindi, Urdu, Bengali and Tamil. The word or other morpheme that corresponds to an English preposition occurs after its complement, hence the name postposition. The following examples are from Japanese, where the case markers perform a role similar to that of adpositions:

a. ..mise ni

store to = 'to the store'

b. ..ie kara

house from = 'from the house'

c. ..hashi de

chopsticks with = 'with chopsticks'

And from Finnish, where the case endings perform a role similar to that of adpositions:

a. ..kauppaan

store.to = 'to the store'

b. ..talosta

house.from = 'from the house'

c. ..puikoilla

chopsticks.with = 'with chopsticks'

While English is generally seen as lacking postpositions entirely, there are a couple of words that one can in fact view as postpositions, e.g. the crisis two years ago, sleep the whole night through. Since a phrase like two years ago distributes just like a prepositional phrase, one can argue that ago should be classified as a postposition, as opposed to as an adjective or adverb.

=== Circumpositional phrases ===
Circumpositional phrases involve both a preposition and a postposition, whereby the complement appears between the two. Circumpositions are common in Pashto and Kurdish. English has at least one circumpositional construction, e.g.

a. From now on, he won't help.

German has more of them, e.g.

b. Von mir aus kannst du das machen.

From me out can you that do = 'As far as I'm concerned, you can do it.'

c. Um der Freundschaft willen sollst du es machen.

around the friendship sake should you it do = 'For the sake of friendship, you should do it.'

== Representation ==
Like with all other types of phrases, theories of syntax render the syntactic structure of adpositional phrases using trees. The trees that follow represent adpositional phrases according to two modern conventions for rendering sentence structure, first in terms of the constituency relation of phrase structure grammars and then in terms of the dependency relation of dependency grammars. The following labels are used on the nodes in the trees: Adv = adverb, N = nominal (noun or pronoun), P = preposition/postposition, and PP = pre/postpositional phrase:

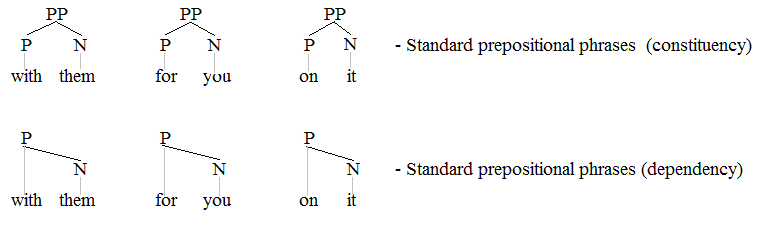

These phrases are identified as prepositional phrases by the placement of PP at the top of the constituency trees and of P at the top of the dependency trees. English also has a number of two-part prepositional phrases, i.e. phrases that can be viewed as containing two prepositions, e.g.

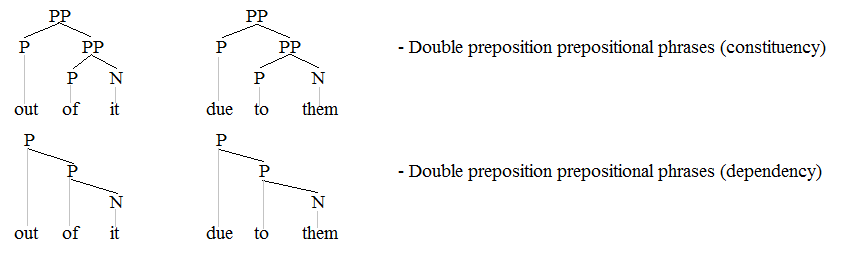

Assuming that ago in English is indeed a postposition as suggested above, a typical ago-phrase would receive the following structural analyses:

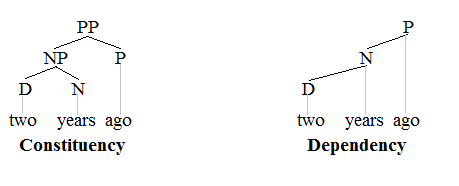

The analysis of circumpositional phrases is not so clear, since it is not obvious which of the two adpositions should be viewed as the head of the phrase. However, the following analyses are more in line with the fact that English is primarily a head-initial language:

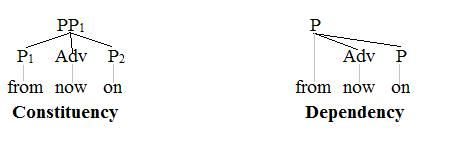

== Distribution ==
The distribution of prepositional phrases in English can be characterized in terms of heads and dependents. Prepositional phrases typically appear as postdependents of nouns, adjectives, and finite and non-finite verbs, although they can also appear as predependents of finite verbs, for instance when they initiate clauses. For ease of presentation, just dependency trees are now employed to illustrate these points. The following trees show prepositional phrases as postdependents of nouns and adjectives:

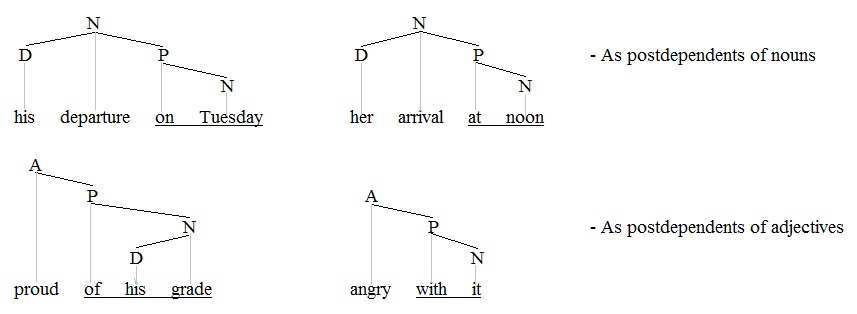

And the following trees show prepositional phrases as postdependents of non-finite verbs and as predependents of finite verbs:

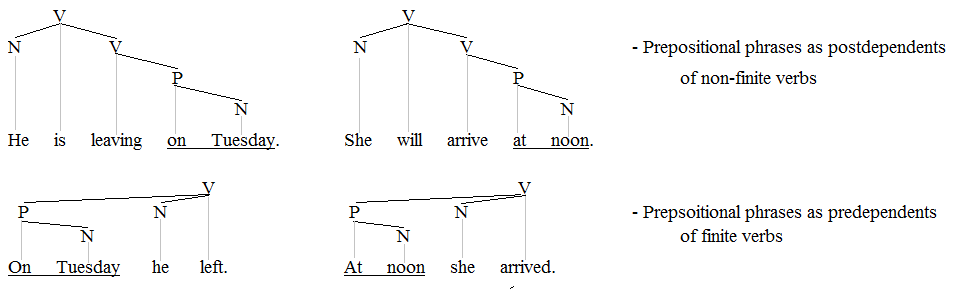

Attempts to position a prepositional phrase in front of its head noun, adjective, or non-finite verb create an incorrectly formatted sentence, e.g.

a. his departure on Tuesday
b. *his on Tuesday departure

a. proud of his grade
b. *of his grade proud

a. He is leaving on Tuesday.
b. *He is on Tuesday leaving.

The b-examples demonstrate that prepositional phrases in English prefer to appear as postdependents of their heads. The fact, however, that they can at times appear as a predependent of their head (as in the finite clauses above) is curious.

== Function ==
More often than not, a given adpositional phrase is an adjunct in the clause or noun phrase that it appears in. These phrases can also, however, function as arguments, in which case they are known as oblique:

a. She ran under him. - Adjunct at the clause level

b. The man from China was enjoying his noodles. - Adjunct in a noun phrase.

c. He gave money to the cause. - Oblique argument at the clause level

d. She argued with him. - Oblique Argument at the clause level

e. A student of physics attended. - Argument in a noun phrase

== Particles ==
A prepositional phrase should not be confused with the particle that comprises a phrasal verb. Phrasal verbs often consist of a verb and a particle, whereby the particle is mistakenly interpreted to be a preposition, e.g.

a. He turned on the light. - on is a particle, not a preposition
b. He turned it on. - Shifting manifests on as a particle

a. She made up a story. - up is a particle, not a preposition
b. She made it up. - Shifting manifests up as a particle

a. They put off the party. - off is a particle, not a preposition
b. They put it off. - Shifting manifests off as a particle.

A phrasal verb's shifting particle occurs immediately subsequent to a transitive object rather than the transitive that comprises the phrasal verb. Prepositions cannot perform such shifting, i.e., they cannot grammatically switch positions with their complement, e.g. He is relying on Susan versus the ungrammatical *He is relying Susan on
