= Phrase structure grammar =

Type of grammar based on constituent entities

The term phrase structure grammar was originally introduced by Noam Chomsky as the term for grammar studied previously by Emil Post and Axel Thue (Post canonical systems). Some authors, however, reserve the term for more restricted grammars in the Chomsky hierarchy: context-sensitive grammars or context-free grammars. In a broader sense, phrase structure grammars are also known as constituency grammars. The defining character of phrase structure grammars is thus their adherence to the constituency relation, as opposed to the dependency relation of dependency grammars.

== History ==
In 1956, Chomsky wrote, "A phrase-structure grammar is defined by a finite vocabulary (alphabet) V_{p}, and a finite set Σ of initial strings in V_{p}, and a finite set F of rules of the form: X → Y, where X and Y are strings in V_{p}."

== Constituency relation ==
In linguistics, phrase structure grammars are all those grammars that are based on the constituency relation, as opposed to the dependency relation associated with dependency grammars; hence, phrase structure grammars are also known as constituency grammars. Any of several related theories for the parsing of natural language qualify as constituency grammars, and most of them have been developed from Chomsky's work, including

- Government and binding theory
- Generalized phrase structure grammar
- Head-driven phrase structure grammar
- Lexical functional grammar
- The minimalist program
- Nanosyntax

Further grammar frameworks and formalisms also qualify as constituency-based, although they may not think of themselves as having spawned from Chomsky's work, e.g.

- Arc pair grammar, and
- Categorial grammar.

== See also ==
- Catena
