= Representation theory (linguistics) =

Representation theory (RT) is a theoretical linguistic framework in the generative tradition, created and developed by Edwin S. Williams – chiefly in an eponymous monograph of 2003. Williams compares it with other frameworks such as Noam Chomsky's minimalist program, and argues that his proposal has significant descriptive and conceptual advantages over them. The substance of the proposal is that linguistic derivation is the result of mappings and mismappings between an open set of 'representations', which in one dimension correspond to increasingly larger locality domains and in the other pair 'syntactic' (sentential and sub-sentential) and 'semantic' (as well as pragmatic) levels. Cross-linguistic variation is then accounted for by the prioritisation of 'faithfulness' to some representations over others.

== See also ==
- Discourse representation theory
