= Move α =

Feature of transformational grammar

Move α is a feature of many transformational-generative grammars, first developed in the Revised Extended Standard Theory (REST) by Noam Chomsky in the late 1970s and later part of government and binding theory (GB) in the 1980s and the Minimalist Program of the 1990s. The term refers to the relation between an indexed constituent and its trace t, e.g., the relation of whom and t in the example

(1) Whom_{i} do you think you are kidding t_{i}?

In (1), the constituent (whom) and its trace (t) are said to form a "chain".

In syntax, Move α is the most general formulation of possible movement permitted by a rule. More specific rules include Move NP and Move wh, which in turn are more general than specific transformations such as those involved in passivization. This marks a shift of attention in transformational grammar around the 1970s, away from focussing on specific rules to underlying principles constraining them, which culminated into the development of the Principles and Parameters framework in the 1980s.

Because in isolation Move α produces massive overgeneration, it is heavily constrained by the other components of the grammar (Chomsky, 1980). Its application is restricted by the Subjacency principle of the Bounding theory, and its output is subject to a variety of filters, principles, etc. stated by other modules of GB.

In 1984 Howard Lasnik and Mamoru Saito unified Move α and other syntactic operations, such as Insertion and Deletion, into what they called Affect α, a generalization to the effect of "Do anything to any category". The latter is viewed with suspicion by proponents of REST as an overgeneralization.

In the Minimalist Program, first developed in the 1990s, Move α (simply called Move) initially became a structure-building operation together with "Merge". However, Chomsky later proposed that Move is simply the application of Merge where one of the two Merged objects is an internal part of the other, thus eliminating Move as an autonomous operation.

== See also ==
- Movement paradox
- Syntactic movement
- Wh-movement
