= Sciullo =

Sciullo (or Di Sciullo) may refer to:

== Surname ==
- Anna Maria Di Sciullo (born 1951), Canadian Italian linguist and professor
- Camillo Di Sciullo (1853–1935), Italian typographer and anarchist
- Jeffrey Sciullo (born 1987), American professional wrestler and musician
- Steve Sciullo (born 1980), American football player
