= Edwin S. Williams =

American linguist (born 1948)

- Born: 1948 (age 76–77)
- Education: Massachusetts Institute of Technology (PhD)
- Scientific career
- Fields: Morphology, syntax
- Institutions: Princeton University
- Thesis: Rule Ordering in Syntax (1974)
- Doctoral advisor: Noam Chomsky

Edwin Samuel Williams (born 1948) is an American linguist and Emeritus Professor of linguistics at Princeton University. He is known for his expertise on morphology and syntax. Williams is credited as the creator of representation theory.

== Books ==
- On the Definition of Word, Anna Maria Di Sciullo and Edwin Williams, MIT Press
- Thematic Structure in Syntax, MIT Press
- Regimes of Derivation in Syntax and Morphology, Routledge
- Representation Theory, MIT Press
