= Hillert =

Hillert is a surname. Notable people with the surname include:

- Dieter Hillert (born 1956), German/American linguist and cognitive scientist
- Margaret Hillert (1920–2014), American writer and poet
- Mats Hillert (1924–2022), Swedish metallurgist
- Richard Hillert (1923–2010), American composer
