= On the Definition of Word =

1987 book by Anna Maria Di Sciullo and Edwin S. Williams

- Author: Anna Maria Di Sciullo, Edwin S. Williams
- Language: English
- Subject: morphology
- Publisher: MIT Press
- Publication date: 1987
- Pages: x + 118
- ISBN: 9780262040914

On the Definition of Word is a 1987 book by Anna Maria Di Sciullo and Edwin S. Williams in which the authors examine the notion of word in linguistics. They distinguish four concepts of "word": listemes, morphological objects, syntactic atoms, and phonological words. The authors' main claim is that there is a strict distinction between syntax and morphology.

== Reception ==
Andrew Carstairs, Mark Baker, Sofia Ananiadou and Masayuki Ike-uchi have reviewed the book.
