= Structure preservation principle =

The Structure Preservation Principle is a generalization going back to Joseph Emonds' 1970 MIT dissertation and widely adopted afterwards. It claims, in a nutshell, that the result of syntactic transformation must be structurally identical to a structure that can be generated without transformations. For example, the by then popular passive transformation derives

Prince Jamal was strangled by Fabio.

from the active

Fabio strangled Prince Jamal.

But the syntactic structure of the passive sentence, Subj Aux V-Participle Prep NP is by and large the same as that found in an active sentence like

Prince Jamal has dined at Fabio's.

This did not follow from general properties of syntactic transformations at the time. In principle, these could have generated e.g. passive sentences that look nothing like any active sentence (e.g. was by Fabio strangled Prince Jamal). The Structure Preservation Principle thus restricted the generative power of transformations by restricting the output of transformations to those kinds of structures that could also occur in simple, non-transformed sentences.
