= Dieter Hillert =

German-American biolinguist and cognitive scientist

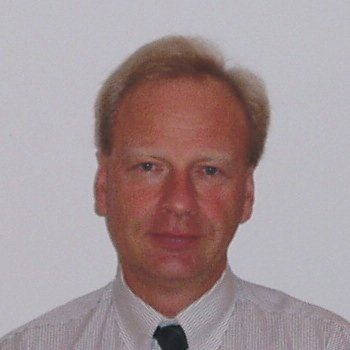
Dieter Hillert

Dieter Gilberto Hillert (German: [ˈdi:tɐ gɪlbɐto hɪlɐt]) is a German-American biolinguist and cognitive scientist. His research focuses on the human language faculty as a cognitive and neurological system. He is known for work on the neurobiology of language, real-time sentence processing, and language evolution. He advocates comparative evolutionary studies of cognition, argues against tabula rasa models, and favors computational theories of mind.

== Biography ==
Hillert was born in Wiesbaden-Sonnenberg (West Germany) in 1956, as second son of Guido Joachim Hillert, an aerospace and civil engineer, and his wife Charlotte Hillert, née Holland-Cunz. He spent his youth in Wiesbaden and attended Johannes Gutenberg University Mainz and Goethe University Frankfurt am Main. He was clinically trained in neurolinguistics at the medical school of the RWTH Aachen, Germany. Hillert received his degrees up to the Ph.D. and Habilitation (Priv.-Doz.) from the Goethe University Frankfurt am Main. His academic career started as a post-doc for neurolinguistics in France at the Centre Paul Broca in Paris, in the United States at Boston University and MIT, in Canada at the Université du Québec à Montréal. He was then appointed as a lecturer at the University of Manchester in England, and continued his academic career at the University of California, San Diego in the United States. Occasionally, he lectures in Japan, inter alia, at the Kyoto University and the University of Tokyo. He contributes to the science of language by publishing theoretical and experimental research on various language-related themes such as sentence processing, figurative language, semantics and syntax, bilingualism, aphasia, and language evolution. He received several awards from the Alexander von Humboldt Foundation and the Japan Society for the Promotion of Science.

== Books and Volumes ==
- Hillert, D. (2026). The Birth of Language. New York, NY: Routledge. ISBN 9781041130871
- Hillert, D. (Ed. 2017). Language Evolution. On the Origin of Lexical and Syntactic Structures. Journal of Neurolinguistics 43 (B), p. 75-274. https://www.sciencedirect.com/journal/journal-of-neurolinguistics/vol/43/part/https
- Hillert, D. (2017). Die Natur der Sprache. Evolution, Paradigmen & Schaltkreise. Heidelberg: Springer. ISBN 978-3-658-20112-8
- Hillert, D. (2014). The Nature of Language. Evolution, Paradigms & Circuits. New York: Springer. ISBN 978-1-4939-0608-6
- Hillert, D. (Ed. 1998). Sentence Processing: A Cross-linguistic Perspective. Syntax and Semantics 31. San Diego: Academic Press. ISBN 978-0126135312
- Hillert, D. (Ed. 1994). Linguistics and Cognitive Neuroscience: Theoretical and Empirical Studies on Language Disorders. Linguistische Berichte 6. ISBN 978-3531126005
- Hillert, D. (1990). Sprachprozesse und Wissensstrukturen. Wiesbaden: Westdeutscher Verlag. ISBN 3-531-12217-7
- Hillert, D. (1987). Zur mentalen Repräsentation von Wortbedeutungen. Tübinger Beiträge Linguistik 290. Tübingen: Gunter Narr Verlag. ISBN 3-87808-348-3

== Selected Articles and Essays ==
- Hillert, D. (2026b) Adaptive trait package for mind reading and language. Front. Lang. Sci. 5: 1851229. https://doi.org/10.3389/flang.2026.1851229
- Hillert, D. (2026a). Language as a mental capacity. Front. Lang. Sci. 4: 1710323. https://doi.org/10.3389/flang.2025.1710323
- Hillert, D.G. (2023). On how “early syntax” came about. Front. Lang. Sci. 2: 1251498. https://doi.org/10.3389/flang.2023.1251498
- Hillert, D.G. & Fujita, K. (2023). Pragmatic language in genus Homo. Biolinguistics 17: e11911. https://doi.org/10.5964/bioling.11911
- Hillert, D. (2021). How did language evolve in the lineage of higher primates? Lingua 264, 103158. https://doi.org/10.1016/j.lingua.2021.103158
- Hillert, D. (2019). Neurobiology of Language. In K. Shackelford and V.A. Weekes-Shackelford (Eds.) Encyclopedia of Evolutionary Psychological Science. Cham: Springer. http://doi.org/10.1007/978-3-319-16999-6_3334-2
- Hillert D.G. (2017). Nimm's nicht so wörtlich. In: S. Ayan (Ed.) Rätsel Mensch - Expeditionen im Grenzbereich von Philosophie und Hirnforschung. Heidelberg: Springer. ISBN 978-3-662-50327-0
- Hillert, D.G. (2012). Figuras retóricas: un reto para el cerebro. Edición española de Scientific American: Mente y Cerebro Nº 55, 38-42. ISSN 1695-0887
- Hillert, D. (2015). On the Evolving Biology of Language. Frontiers in Psychology 6, 1796. https://doi.org/10.3389/fpsyg.2015.01796
- Hillert, D.G. & Buracas, G.T. (2009). The Neural Substrates of Spoken Idiom Comprehension. Language and Cognitive Processes 24 (9), 1370-1391. http://doi.org/10.1080/01690960903057006
- Hillert, D.G. (2008). On Idioms: Cornerstones of a Neurological Model of Language Processing. Journal of Cognitive Science 9(2), 193-233. http://hdl.handle.net/10371/7090
- Hillert, D. & Ackerman, F. (2002). Accessing and Parsing Phrasal Predicates. In N. Dehé, R. Jackendoff, A. McIntryre, and S. Urban (Eds.) Verb-Particle Explorations. Berlin, New York: Mouton de Gruyter, p. 289-313. http://doi.org/10.1515/9783110902341
- Hillert, D. & Swinney, D. (2001). The Processing of Fixed Expressions during Sentence Comprehension. In A. Cienki, B.J. Luka, and M.B. Smith (Eds.) Conceptual Structure, Discourse, and Language. Stanford: CSLI, p. 107-121. ISBN 1575862581
- Hillert, D. (2001). On Processing Lexical Concepts in Aphasia and Alzheimer's disease. Some (Re)considerations. Brain and Language 69, 95-118. https://doi.org/10.1006/brln.1999.2053
- Hillert, D. (1992). Semantics and Aphasia: A State-of-the-Art review. Journal of Neurolinguistics 7 (1), 1-43. https://doi.org/10.1016/0911-6044(92)90010-T
