= Anna Maria Di Sciullo =

Canadian linguist

- Born: 1951 (age 74–75)
- Education: Université du Québec à Montréal (UQAM); University of Montreal; Massachusetts Institute of Technology (MIT)
- Occupations: Professor; Researcher; Linguist
- Awards: 2017 Nominated for the Canadian Governor General award for innovation 2016 André Laurendeau Award, ACFAS, Government of Quebec. 2015 Ambassador of Abruzzi in the world, Government of Italy. 2005-2018 Dynamic Interfaces (FQRSC I, II, III), Government of Quebec, $1.2M. 2007 Founder and Director of the International Network in Biolinguistics. 2003-2012 Interface Asymmetries (MCRI), SSHRC, Government of Canada, $2.5M. 2004 Founder and President of the Federation on Natural Language Processing; 2001-2004 Natural language processing (VRQ), Government of Quebec,$1.2M. 1999 Fellow of the Royal Society of Canada; 1998-2003 Natural Language Asymmetries (MCRI), SSHRC, Government of Canada, $1.8M. 1992-1996 The Modularity of Grammar: arguments, projections and variation, SSHRC, Government of Canada, $629577. 1990 Award for Excellence in Research, awarded by the board of Governors of the University of Quebec.

Anna Maria Di Sciullo (born 1951) is a professor in the Linguistics Department at the Université du Québec à Montréal and visiting scientist at the Department of Linguistics at New York University. Her research areas are Theoretical Linguistics, Computational Linguistics and Biolinguistics.

== Field of research ==
Dr. Di Sciullo's contributions to Theoretical Linguistics are centered on asymmetry as a cornerstone of the Language Faculty. Her research on the asymmetry of morphological relations provides a further understanding of the regularity of form and interpretation of word internal argument, aspect and operator structures. Her publications include two MIT Press books on the centrality of asymmetrical relations in morpho-syntax.

Her work in Computational Linguistics led to the formulation of the Asymmetry Recovering Parser, generating deterministic parses for linguistic expressions. She also developed a search engine sensitive to asymmetric relations, as well as a semantic mining system based on syntactic asymmetries and semantic compositionality.

Her contributions to Biolinguistics target the sensitivity of the human brain to morpho-syntactic asymmetries as well as the role of experience on morpho-syntactic variation. In addition to her publications in Brain and Language and BMC Evolutionary Biology, she published in 2017 four volumes on Biolinguistics, Critical concepts in Linguistics covering major contributions in the field.

Since 1998, she has directed Major Collaborative Research Initiatives highly funded by the Social Sciences and Humanities Research Council of Canada and by the Fonds de recherche du Québec. In 2004 she founded the Federation on Natural Language Processing, bringing together main actors in the area of theoretical linguistics, computational linguistics and information technology, in 2007 she founded the International Network on Biolinguistics, bridging biology, linguistics and bioinformatics.

She has received numerous distinctions and awards, including the following. She has been elected Fellow of the Royal Society of Canada in 1999, recipient of the Research Award of the Board of Directors of the University of Quebec in 2001, visiting scholar positions at Harvard and MIT in 2012, recipient of the André Laurendeau award in Human Sciences in 2016, and recently nominated for the Governor General of Canada innovation award.

== Selected bibliography ==
- Di Sciullo, Anna Maria, Marco Nicolis and Stanca Somesfalean. 2020. Comitative P. In J. Garzonio and S. Rossi (Eds.), Variation in P, Comparative Approaches to Adpositional Phrases. Oxford Studies in Comparative Syntax. Oxford University Press. 218–244. ISBN 978-0-190-93125-4
- Di Sciullo, Anna Maria. 2019. Unbounded Merge. Inference. International Review of Science, 4 (4). ISSN 2576-4403
- Di Sciullo, Anna Maria. 2017 (Ed.). Biolinguistics. Critical Concepts in Linguistics. Volume 1: Foundations; Volume II: Language Development; Volume III: Variation; Volume IV: Complexity and Efficiency. Routledge. Taylor and Francis. 1632p. ISBN 978-1-138-85915-9
- Di Sciullo, Anna Maria. 2017. Asymmetry and the language faculty. Revista Linguística. Gramática Gerativa: celebrando os 60 anos de Syntactic Structures (1957- 2017), 13(2): 88–107. (ISSN 2238-975x)
- Di Sciullo, Anna Maria and Lyle Jenkins. 2016. Biolinguistics and the Human Language Faculty. Language, 92(3): e1-e32. ISSN 1535-0665
- Di Sciullo, Anna Maria and Stanca Somesfalean. 2015. Object Pronouns in the Evolution of Romanian: a Biolinguistic Perspective. In V. Hill (Ed.), Formal Approaches to DPs in Old Romanian 269–290. Leiden, Boston. Brill. ISBN 978-90-04-28771-6
- Di Sciullo, A.M. 2015. On the Domain Specificity of the Human Language Faculty and the Effects of Principles of Computational Efficiency: Contrasting Language and Mathematics. LinguiStica. 11 (1) 28–56. (ISSN 2238-975x)
- Di Sciullo, Anna Maria. 2014. Minimalism and I-Morphology. In Peter Kosta, Steven Franks and Teodora Radeva-Bork (Eds.), Minimalism and Beyond: Radicalizing the interfaces. Amsterdam: John Benjamins. ISBN 978-9-027-20828-6
- Di Sciullo, Anna Maria. 2011. A Biolinguistic Approach to Variation. In A. M. Di Sciullo and C. Boeckx (Eds.), The biolinguistic Entreprise: New Perspectives on the Evolution and Nature of the Human Language Faculty, 305–328. Oxford: Oxford University Press. ISBN 978-0-199-55328-0
- Di Sciullo, Anna Maria et al. 2010. The Biological Nature of Human Language. Biolinguistics 4: 4-34. ISSN 1450-3417
- Di Sciullo, Anna Maria and Dana Isac. 2008. The Asymmetry of Merge. Biolinguistics 2: 260–290. ISSN 1450-3417
- Di Sciullo, Anna Maria. 2005. Asymmetry in Morphology. Cambridge. Mass: The MIT Press. ISBN 978-0-262-04229-1
- Di Sciullo, Anna Maria. 2003 (Ed.). Asymmetry in Grammar. vol. 1: Syntax and Semantics. Amsterdam: John Benjamins. 405p. ISBN 978-9-027-22778-2 | Asymmetry in Grammar. vol. 2: Morphology, Phonology, Acquisition. Amsterdam: John Benjamins. 309p. ISBN 978-9-027-22779-9
- Di Sciullo, Anna Maria. 2000. Parsing Asymmetries. Natural Language Processing. Lecture Notes in Computer Science Volume 1835:1-15. Dordrecht: Springer. ISBN 978-3-540-67605-8
- Di Sciullo, Anna Maria. 1996. Modularity and X0/XP Asymmetries. Linguistic Analysis 26: 1-26. ISSN 0098-9053
- Di Sciullo, Anna Maria. 1993. The Complement Domain of a Head at Morphological Form. Probus: International Journal of Latin and Romance Linguistics 5: 95–125. ISSN 1613-4079
- Di Sciullo, Anna Maria and Edwin Williams. 1987. On the Definition of Word. Cambridge. Mass: The MIT Press. ISBN 978-0-262-54047-6
- Di Sciullo, Anna Maria. 1986. Théorie et Description en Grammaire Générative. Québec. Office de la langue française. 228 pp. ISBN 978-2-551-08982-6

== Selected awards and nominations ==
- 2017 Nominated for the Canadian Governor General award for innovation
- 2016 Andre Laurendeau Award, ACFAS, Government of Quebec.
- 2015 Ambassador of Abruzzi in the world, Government of Italy.
- 2005-2018 Dynamic Interfaces (FQRSC I, II, III), Government of Quebec, $1.2M.
- 2007 Founder and Director of the International Network in Biolinguistics.
- 2003-2012 Interface Asymmetries (MCRI), SSHRC, Government of Canada, $2.5M.
- 2004 Founder and President of the Federation on Natural Language Processing
- 2001-2004 Natural language processing (VRQ), Government of Quebec, $1.2M.
- 1999 Fellow of the Royal Society of Canada
- 1998-2003 Natural Language Asymmetries (MCRI), SSHRC, Government of Canada, $1.8M.
- 1992-1996 The Modularity of Grammar: arguments, projections and variation, SSHRC, Government of Canada, $629577.
- 1990 Award for Excellence in Research, awarded by the board of Governors of the University of Quebec.

== Cited in ==
- Cinque, Guglielmo (2004). "Restructuring and functional structure". In Beletti, Adriana (ed.). Structures and beyond. The cartography of syntactic structures. Oxford University Press. pp. 132–191. ISBN 978-0-19-517197-6.
- Cinque, Guglielmo (2006). Restructuring and functional heads. Oxford University Press. ISBN 978-0-19-517954-5.
- Uriagereka, Juan (2012). Spell-out and the Minimalist Program. Oxford University Press. ISBN 978-0-19-959353-8.
- Moro, Andrea (2008). The boundaries of Babel. The Brain and the Enigma of Impossible Languages. MIT Press. ISBN 978-0-26-251506-1.
- Pylkkanen, Liina (2008). Introducing Arguments. MIT Press. ISBN 978-0-26-266209-3.
- Collins, John (2011). The Unity of Linguistic Meaning. Oxford University Press. ISBN 978-0-19-969484-6.
- Hinzen, Wolfram; Sheehan, Michelle (2013). The Philosophy of Universal Grammar. Oxford University Press. ISBN 978-0-19-965483-3.
- http://asymmetryproject.uqam.ca/pdf/cv.pdf Curriculum vitae of Professor Anna Maria Di Sciullo
