= Principles and parameters =

Generative linguistics framework

Principles and parameters is a framework within generative grammar in which the syntax of a natural language is described in accordance with general principles (i.e. abstract rules or grammars) and specific parameters (i.e. markers, switches) that for particular languages are either turned on or off. For example, the position of heads in phrases is determined by a parameter. Whether a language is head-initial or head-final is regarded as a parameter which is either on or off for particular languages (i.e. English is head-initial, whereas Japanese is head-final). Principles and parameters was largely formulated by the linguists Noam Chomsky and Howard Lasnik. Many linguists have worked within this framework, and for a period of time it was considered the dominant form of mainstream generative linguistics.

Principles and parameters as a grammar framework is also known as government and binding theory. That is, the two terms principles and parameters and government and binding refer to the same school in the generative tradition of phrase structure grammars (as opposed to dependency grammars). However, Chomsky considers the term misleading.

== Framework ==
The central idea of principles and parameters is that a person's syntactic knowledge can be modelled with two formal mechanisms:

- A finite set of fundamental principles that are common to all languages; e.g., that a sentence must always have a subject, even if it is not overtly pronounced.
- A finite set of parameters that determine syntactic variability amongst languages; e.g., a binary parameter that determines whether or not the subject of a sentence must be overtly pronounced (this example is sometimes referred to as the pro-drop parameter).

Within this framework, the goal of linguistics is to identify all of the principles and parameters that are universal to human language (called universal grammar). As such, any attempt to explain the syntax of a particular language using a principle or parameter is cross-examined with the evidence available in other languages. This leads to continual refinement of the theoretical machinery of generative linguistics in an attempt to account for as much syntactic variation in human language as possible.

== Language acquisition ==
The Principles and Parameters approach is a postulated solution to Plato's Problem, as defined and stipulated by Chomsky. This program seeks to explain the apparent gap between linguistic knowledge and linguistic competency. In particular, given finite and possibly incomplete input, how do children in different linguistic environments rapidly arrive at an accurate and complete grammar that seems to exhibit universal and non-obvious similarities?

According to this framework, principles and parameters are part of a genetically innate universal grammar (UG) which all humans possess, barring any genetic disorders. As such, principles and parameters do not need to be learned by exposure to language. Rather, exposure to language merely triggers the parameters to adopt the correct setting. The problem is simplified considerably if children are innately equipped with mental apparatus that reduces and in a sense directs the search space amongst possible grammars. The P&P approach is an attempt to provide a precise and testable characterization of this innate endowment which consists of universal "Principles" and language-specific, binary "Parameters" that can be set in various ways. The interaction of the principles and the parameter settings produces all known languages while excluding non-natural languages.

== Criticisms ==
Criticism of the P&P approach has come from a number of quarters, but with varying impact. These can be subdivided into three main groups.

- Theory internal critique
- The lack of consensus on a set of parameters
- Inter-paradigm critiques not specific to P&P

Perhaps the most influential criticisms of P&P have been theory internal. As in any other developing field of enquiry, research published within the P&P paradigm often suggests reformulations and variations of the basic P&P premises. Notable debates emerged within P&P including (a) derivationalism vs representationalism (b) the locus of morphology (e.g. lexicalism vs derived morphology) and (c) the tension between a production model and a competence model amongst others. The development of head-driven phrase structure grammar (HPSG) and lexical functional grammar (LFG) reflect these debates: these are both strongly lexicalist and representational systems. Nevertheless, perhaps the most coherent and substantial critique of P&P is the Minimalist Program, Noam Chomsky's most recent proposal. This program of research utilizes conceptions of economy to enhance the search for universal principles and parameters. Linguists in this program assume that humans use as economic a system as possible in their innate syntactic knowledge. The Minimalist Program takes issue with the large number of independent postulations in P&P and either (a) reduces them to more fundamental principles (e.g. Merge, Move, Agree), (b) derives them from 'reasonable' interface constraints on derivations (e.g. bottom-up Merge and requirement that no derivation be counter-cyclic derives Relativized Minimality effects) or (c) programmatically suggests that they be either derived from more basic principles or eliminated subject to future research (e.g. Binding Principles). Note that there is debate about whether the Minimalist Program is motivated by the empirical shortcomings of P&P or whether it is motivated by ideological concerns with 'elegance' etc. (see main article on the Minimalist Program).

Aside from this major move within the discipline, it seems that consensus has not been achieved over a list of universal parameters. Certainly, there is no publicly available list of these parameters and textbooks tend to cite the same ones: the interrelated verb-movement parameters (V-v, V-T, T-C), noun-movement parameters (N-D), subject-related parameters (pro-drop and EPP) and headedness parameters. This is not to say that the theory has not been fruitful (e.g. Holmberg and Platzak’s comprehensive analysis of parametric variation in Scandinavian languages), or that the theory is not descriptively adequate, but rather that the accomplishments of this line of thinking have been less than anticipated in terms of explanatory adequacy. Particularly, a systematic, predictive system of parameters, their properties and interactions, along the lines of the periodic table in chemistry, has yet to be developed. Generally, theorists have moved to regarding parameters as varying feature specifications on lexical items within languages and derivations rather than parameters which are globally defined.

For example, while formal linguistics takes the sentence to be the canonical unit of analysis, conversation analysis (CA) takes the turn at talk as canonical. Speakers in conversation often do not use complete sentences or even complete words to converse. Rather, discourse is composed of sequences of turns which are composed of Turn construction unit (e.g. a word, phrase, clause, sentence). In CA, the form and meaning of an utterance is a product of situated activity- which is to say meaning is highly contextual (within a social, interactive context) and contingent upon how participants respond to each other regardless of grammatical completeness of an utterance.

Similarly, other discourse and corpus linguistic analyses have found recursion and other forms of grammatical complexity to be rather rare in spoken discourse (especially in preliterate societies) but common in written discourse suggesting that much of grammatical complexity may in fact be a product of literacy training.

Other critics point out that there is little if anything that can unequivocally be called universal across the world's languages. Discourse analyses have focused on the dynamic, dialogic, and social nature of language use in social situations. These critics argue that P&P and discourse analysis differ in the same way that chemistry and cookery differ: one is the study of fundamental interactions at a micro-scale in a deterministic model that attempts to be scientific in the broad sense, the other is a more macro-scale, non-deterministic, non-scientific model focussing on use of chemicals in everyday situations in the real world. What these critiques have in common is the claim that the analysis of I-language does not carry over to E-language. From a Chomskyan perspective, this is a truism because the two objects of study are fundamentally different.

There is a tendency for inter-paradigm critiques to focus on a number of assumptions that are commonly associated with P&P, but which actually are common to Chomskyan generative linguistics as a whole. These include innateness, modularity, the poverty of the stimulus, language universals, binarity, etc. See for example, Connectionist, Functionalist and Cognitivist critiques. As another example, the linguist Larry Trask argues that the ergative case system of the Basque language is not a simple binary parameter, and that different languages can have different levels of ergativity. Also, some have argued using evidence from historical linguistics that grammar is an emergent property of language use. Language evolution theorist, Terrence Deacon notes that it is problematic to consider language structure as innate - that is, as having been subject to the forces of natural selection, because languages change much too quickly for natural selection to act upon them. There are many more critiques. There is debate about the validity of these arguments, but since these are not specific to P&P they will not be dealt with here.

== Examples ==
Examples of theorized principles are:

- Structure preservation principle
- Trace erasure principle
- Projection principle
- Subjacency principle
- Empty category principle

Examples of theorized parameters are:

- Ergative case parameter
- Head directionality parameter
- Nominal mapping parameter
- Null subject parameter
- Polysynthesis parameter
- Pro-drop parameter
- Serial verb parameter
- Subject placement parameter
- Subject side parameter
- Topic prominent parameter
- Verb attraction parameter

== See also ==
- Government and binding
- Projection Principle
- Extended Projection Principle
- Theta criterion
- Poverty of the stimulus
- Tabula rasa
