= Projection =

Projection or projections may refer to:

== Physics ==
- Projection (physics), the action/process of light, heat, or sound reflecting from a surface to another in a different direction
- The display of images by a projector

== Graphics and cartography ==
- 3D projection, the production of a two-dimensional image of a three-dimensional object
- Map projection, reducing the surface of a three-dimensional planet to a flat map

== Chemistry ==
- Fischer projection, a two-dimensional representation of a three-dimensional organic molecule
- Haworth projection, a way of writing a structural formula to represent the cyclic structure of monosaccharides
- Natta projection, a way to depict molecules with complete stereochemistry in two dimensions in a skeletal formula
- Newman projection, a visual representation of a chemical bond from front to back

== Mathematics ==
- Projection (mathematics), any of several different types of geometrical mappings
  - Projection (linear algebra), a linear transformation P from a vector space to itself such that P^{2} = P
  - Projection (set theory), one of two closely related types of functions or operations in set theory
  - Projection (measure theory), use of a projection map in measure theory
  - Vector projection, orthogonal projection of a vector onto a straight line
  - Projection (relational algebra), a type of unary operation in relational algebra
- Projection method (fluid dynamics), means of numerically solving time-dependent incompressible fluid-flow problems

== Biology ==
- Projection areas, areas of the brain where sensory processing occurs
- Projection fiber, in neuroscience, white matter fibers that connect the cortex to the lower parts of the brain or the spinal cord

== Linguistics ==
- Projection (linguistics), grammatical trait inheritance from a head to a phrasal category
- Projection principle in syntax
- Projection of presuppositions in linguistics

== Arts and entertainment ==
- Projection (architecture), an architectural element that protrudes beyond the surface of the wall
- "Projections" (Star Trek: Voyager), an episode of the television series Star Trek: Voyager
- Projections (The Blues Project album), 1966
- Projections (John Handy album), 1968
- Projections (film), 2013 Croatian film

== Other uses ==
- Projection (alchemy), process in Alchemy
- Projections (journal), an interdisciplinary academic journal related to cinema and visual media
- Power projection, the capacity of a state to implement policy by means of force, or the threat thereof
- Psychological projection, or "Freudian projection", a defense mechanism in which one attributes to others one's own unacceptable or unwanted attributes, thoughts, or emotions
- Social projection, a cognitive bias that leads people to believe others are similar to themselves
- Forecasting, making predictions of the future based on past and present data
- Population projection, in the field of demography, an estimate of a future population
- Astral projection, a suggested type of out-of-body experience from esotericism

== See also ==
- Project (disambiguation)
- Projection effect (disambiguation)
- Projector (disambiguation)
- Projective (disambiguation)
