= Jaklin Kornfilt =

Theoretical linguist

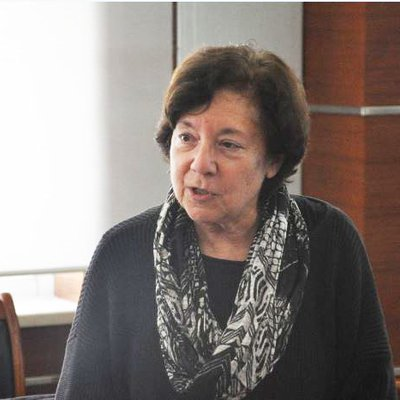
- Awards: Humboldt Prize (2010); Fulbright Fellowship (1999)

Academic background
- Education: Deutsche Schule Istanbul; Heidelberg University; Harvard University
- Thesis: Case marking, agreement and empty categories in Turkish (1985)
- Academic advisors: Susumu Kuno & Noam Chomsky

Academic work
- Discipline: Theoretical linguistics
- Sub-discipline: Syntax and morphology of Turkish and the Turkic languages
- Institutions: Syracuse University
- Website: Syracuse Web page

Jaklin Kornfilt is a theoretical linguist and professor at Syracuse University who is well known for her contributions to the fields of syntax, morphology, Turkish language and grammar, and Turkic language typology.

== Early life and education ==
Kornfilt graduated from German High School in Istanbul, Turkey. She then graduated from Heidelberg University with a bachelor's degree in applied linguistics and translation studies in 1970. She obtained a Master of Arts degree in theoretical linguistics from Harvard University in 1980. She earned a PhD again in theoretical linguistics from the same university in 1985. Her PhD thesis was "Case Marking, Agreement, and Empty Categories in Turkish".

== Career ==
After graduation, Kornfilt began to work as an instructor at Syracuse University in 1983. She became professor of linguistics in 2003 in the Department of Languages, Literatures and Linguistics (LLL). At Syracuse University, she is also former Director of the Linguistic Studies Program and of the Computational Linguistics Program.

She also organized and led a linguistics working group of The Central New York Humanities Corridor, an interdisciplinary partnership with Syracuse University, Cornell University, and the University of Rochester from 2005 to 2010.

Kornfilt was awarded the Humboldt Research Award by the Alexander von Humboldt Foundation in Bamberg in 2010.

In 2021, she was awarded an honorary doctorate by the University of Cyprus for 'her contributions to theoretical and Turkish linguistics'.

== Selected Research ==
=== Descriptive Grammar of Turkish ===
Kornfilt is the author of Turkish (1997), a comprehensive overview of the grammatical properties of the Turkish language. This work is renowned for its near-exhaustive survey of the syntactic and morphological systems of Turkish and is considered the major successor to Turkish-language descriptive grammars of G.L. Lewis’ Turkish Grammar (1967) and Robert Underhill's Turkish Grammar (1976). Her work provided a thorough investigation of the syntactical and morphological properties of Turkish and defining its key typological features and universal characteristics.

Her work is a contribution to the Descriptive Grammars series by the Routledge publishing company. The series overviews a variety of languages through the lens of theoretical and descriptive analyses, using a framework called the Questionnaire as a structural tool for comparing grammars across language types. More specifically, the Questionnaire surveys language features in a manner that is:

1. sufficiently comprehensive to cover the major structures of any language that are likely to be of theoretical interest;
2. sufficiently explicit to make cross-language comparisons a feasible undertaking (in particular, through the detailed numbering key); and
3. sufficiently flexible to encompass the range of variety that is found in human language

Kornfilt's text is one of the first Turkish grammars to "incorporate overtly the native speaker's linguistic intuitions into its language description", as Kornfilt indicates various degrees to which ungrammatical sentences may be judged to be ungrammatical. As she explains in the preface, "[a]nother unusual feature of this book, and especially of the syntax chapter, is probably the fact that shadings of grammaticality or acceptability are noted, rather than reflecting an all-or-nothing approach".

Structure of Turkish

In the preface, Kornfilt traces the genealogical history of Turkish as the Turkic language with the most speakers and a member of the Altaic language family. She notes that Turkish was written in Arabic script from the beginning of its history in the Anatolian peninsula, until its orthography was converted to the Latin alphabet following the language reforms of 1928, upon the establishment of the Republic of Turkey. She emphasizes that this Modern Standard Turkish is the focus of the book.

In five chapters, she surveys Syntax, Morphology, Phonology, Ideophones and Interjections, and Lexicon. With a total of 575 pages, the book devotes an overwhelming majority of attention to Syntax and Morphology. Given that even the Morphology chapter often describes syntactical properties, Kornfilt is primarily interested in the syntax of Turkish:

Ch 1. "Syntax": 211 pages

Ch 2. "Morphology": 270 pages

Ch 3. "Phonology": 32 pages

Ch 4. "Ideophones and Interjections": 3 pages

Ch 5. "Lexicon": 16 pages

"Syntax" and "Morphology"

Across sixteen subparts, the chapter surveys aspects of Turkish syntax: sentence types, subordination, internal sentence structures, phrasal units, negation, anaphora, reflexives, reciprocals, comparative constructions, equatives, possessive constructions, yes–no questions, question-word questions, questions in coordinate structures, means of expressing emphasis, topic, movement processes, and word classes.

A notable innovation of Kornfilt's syntax is observation of the relationship of the palatal glide [y] to copula and auxiliary word classes. Previous grammars such as those of Lewis (1967) and Underhill (1976) identified -DIr, -IDI, -ImIş as "copula" or "auxiliary". Kornfilt argues that the palatal glide [y] belongs in this category as well, as it "shows up after a predicate noun, adjective, or adverbial that has a stem-final vowel; this glide precedes the tense suffix, if there is one, and agreement suffix if there is no tense".

Additionally, Kornfilt denies the existence of a separate topic marker in Turkish syntax. This contradicts the view that the form -ise (copula + conditional) or the particle de are topic markers, as in the following sentences:

(Sentence 1)

Fasulye-yi ise en çok Ayşe sev-iyor.

Bean-Acc. Cop Supl most Ayşe love-pres.

'As for beans, Ayşe likes them the most.'

(Sentence 2)

Fasulye-yi de en çok Ayşe sev-iyor.

Bean-Acc. Part Supl most Ayşe love-pres.

'As for beans, Ayşe likes them the most.'

=== Turkic Languages ===
Written for the book, The World’s Language Families (1990), Kornfilt's chapter on “Turkish and Turkic Languages” is her secondary signature work. Continuing in her contributions to language typology and comparative grammar, Kornfilt highlights the key linguistic features that make Turkic languages unique. The chapter is a highly cited source of comparative linguistics with regards to Turkish.

“General and Historical Background”

Kornfilt provides the background of Turkish and Turkic languages. She specifies how Turkic languages share similar features, including vowel harmony, agglutinative morphology, verb-final word order, and nominalised subordinate clauses. She argues that because Turkic languages share these features, it is often difficult to count the total number of completely separate Turkic languages. Additionally, she introduces a controversy about the external genetic relationships of the Turkic family. She describes that while the majority opinion agrees that Turkic languages belong to the overarching Altaic language family, along with Mongolian and Tungusic languages, outlier perspectives claim Korean, Japanese, and even Uralic languages to be Altaic as well.

With regards to the geographical groupings of Turkic languages, Kornfilt acknowledges that there is no broad consensus on their classifications. Ultimately, she chooses to classify the Modern Standard Turkish spoken in the Republic of Turkey as part of Anatolian dialect of the Osman language group, which is part of the larger South-West Oyuz group of Turkic languages.

“Phonology and Orthography”

Kornfilt highlights the phonological characteristics of Turkish. She begins by remarking on the symmetry of Turkish vowels, as there are four pairs of high and non-high vowels, varying in backness and rounding. She states that non-high vowels can only be round if they are in a word-initial syllable. She argues that the most prominent property of Turkish vowels their adherence to vowel harmony, as they regularly assimilate to one another to match according to backness and rounding.

Kornfilt also explores the orthographic characteristics of written Turkish. While Turkish adopted the Latin script following the writing reforms of 1928, there are a few changes that the Republic of Turkey made in the characterizations of letters. As Kornfilt describes: "Instead of -i, the sign used for the high back non-round vowel, we find ı, i.e. a dotless i. The difference between the two non-round high vowels is signalled in the same way for capital letters: I . for the front, I for the back, high non-round vowel...Other letters that don’t correspond to the familiar phonetic symbols are the following: c for [j], ç for [č], ş for [š], j for [ž]".

Additionally, Kornfilt explores other features of Turkish phonology: syllable-final oral stop devoicing, the k/0 alternation, word-final liquid devoicing, morpheme-initial voicing assimilation, vowel harmony, labial attraction, and word-final stress.

“Morphology”

Kornfilt begins by commenting on the highly agglutinative and suffixing nature of Turkish. Virtually all morphemes in Turkish carry suffix morphemes and an explicit function. The only prefixing operation in Turkish is the intensification of adjectives and adverbs, via the reduplication of the first syllable and the addition of a consonant: e.g. beyaz 'white', bembeyaz 'completely white'; çabuk 'fast', çarçabuk 'very fast'"^{[3]}.

She goes on to survey the most productive suffixes of Turkish, along with the rules governing their order when combined. More specifically, she surveys:

- plural markers: -lAr
- possessive suffixes, referred to as "agreement suffixes" because they express the person and number features of their 'possessors'
- case morphemes
- causative affixes: -lA
- voice suffixes, which are the leftmost productive class of verbal suffixes:
  - middle/reflexive: (-(I)n)
  - reciprocals: (-(I)ş)
  - passives: (-Il/n)
  - causatives: (-DIr/t)
- negation marker: -mA
- mood markers:
  - desideratives: -sA
  - necessitative: -mAlI
  - optative: -(y)a
- tense markers:
  - definite past: -DI
  - reported past: -mIş
  - aorist: -(A)r
  - future: -(y)AcAK
  - present progressive: -(I)yor
- main participle morphemes: -(y)An and -DIK
- converbs, or gerundives:
  - manner suffixes: -(y)ArAk
  - conjunction adverbials: -(y)Ip
  - time adverb suffix: -(y)IncA
- gender markers

=== Government and Binding ===
NP-Movement

Kornfilt has also contributed to understanding of the Government and Binding theory originally proposed by Chomsky. Kornfilt asserts CP-transparency, as proposed by generative theory, in Turkish syntax and refutes the role of restructuring in constructions that violate clause-dependent government rules. Specifically, she focuses on NP-movement of an embedded object to matrix subject position, a specific kind of construction in Turkish that she notes for its "non-local application of an otherwise local process". The constructions are called “Infinitival Double Passives” (IDPs), and are characterized as follows:

1. The understood embedded direct object is the S-Structure matrix subject;
2. Whether an agent phrase shows up or not, the agent of the matrix and of the embedded verb are understood as co-referential, just like in Control contexts in general;
3. The embedded verb is an infinitive (suffix -mAK)-a form found in Control contexts;
4. Both the embedded infinitive and the matrix verb have to carry Passive morphology (with one exception, to be discussed later);
5. Only 3 matrix verbs occur in this construction, exemplified above, all Subject-Control verbs;
6. Infinitives in Turkish bear no Agreement morphology. This is true in Control contexts as well as in IDPs.

The following are some example sentences of Turkish IDPs:

(Sentence 1)

üniversite-ler (polis tarafından) kuşat-ıl-mak iste-n-di

university-pl. police by surround-Pass-Infin. want-Pass-past

'The universities were wanted to be surrounded by the police'

(Sentence 2)

üniversite-ler (polis tarafından) kuşat-ıl-mağ-a başla-n-dı

university-pl. police by surround-Pass-Infin.-Dat. begin-Pass-past

'The universities were begun to be surrounded by the police'

(Sentence 3)

üniversite-ler (polis tarafından) kuşat-ıl-mağ-a çalış-ıl-dı

university-pl. police by surround-Pass-Infin.-Dat. try-Pass-past

'The universities were tried to be surrounded by the police'

The following are active counterparts of the above Turkish IDPs that involve Control:

(Sentence 4)

polis(i) [PRO(i) üniversite-ler-i kuşat-mak] iste-di

police university-pl.-Acc. surround-Infin. want-past

'The police wanted to surround the universities'

(Sentence 5)

polis(i) [PRO(i) üniversite-ler-i kuşat-mağ]-a başla-dı

police university-pl.-Acc. surround-Infin.-Dat. begin-past

'The police begun to surround the universities'

(Sentence 6)

polis(i) [PRO(i) üniversite-ler-i kuşat-mağ]-a çalış-tı

police university-pl.-Acc. surround-Infin.-Dat. try-past

'The police tried to surround the universities'

Kornfilt claims that while IDPs in other languages can normally be explained by Exceptional Case Marking (ECM), the ECM does not operate in Turkish—or, at least, it does not operate in the way that would explain the anomaly of non-local, cross-clausal rule application demonstrated by Turkish IDPs. Accordingly, Kornfilt proposes the question: “If IDPs are not explainable by ECM, why are they grammatical” in Turkish? Her solution: The three "IDP" verbs are triggers of another type of Transparency of maximal projection; purely descriptively speaking, instead of a CP that dominates a verbal IP, what becomes transparent is a CP that dominates a "nominal" IP rather than a "verbal" IP.

In other words, the same CP-Transparency found in factive contexts that renders embedded subjects under the rule of government via the matrix verb is also present in non-factive contexts as well, such as in her Turkish examples. Her proposal links this CP-Transparency phenomenon to the traditional effects of S-bar Deletion in that the ‘offending’ trace in embedded subject position is now properly governed by the main verb and is saved from violating the [Empty Category Principle]. Consequently, she dismisses ECP as a satisfying account of Turkish grammar. Additionally, she dismisses the traditional explanation of “Restructuring” in the case of Turkish IDPs because it violates the Projection Principle of Chomsky's Government and Binding theory; instead, she suggests “CP-Transparency” as a viable alternative explanation that maintains a consistent commitment to Government and Binding and accounts for the cross-clausal application of mono-clausal government found in Turkish IDPs.

Disagreement on Kornfilt's account

Wayne Harbert opposed Kornfilt in his review of her article, claiming that the Turkish examples Kornfilt used are only “an apparent, not a real instance of non-local application of NP-movement”. He argued that Kornfilt had a non-problem on her hands, mistakenly giving an explanation for something that had a simpler, more viable reasoning. He stated that Kornfilt was incorrect to say that the passive morphology she observed in main and subordinate clauses in Turkish are a “result of any particular linkage between the INFL [Inflectional] nodes of the two clauses”; rather, this passivity is realized in the main clause “when the embedded clause is passive by the fact that the failure of the passivized object to get case by moving to matrix subject position would result in ill-formedness”. Harbert presented various case studies that demonstrated various degrees of relaxed government rules from several languages, with some grammars allowing occasional exceptions to the rule and other grammars adopting non-standard treatment of structure effectively minimize the syntactic distance between the related elements without movement”. In effect, Harbert attempted to minimize the novelty of Kornfilt's Turkish IDPs by presenting cases of non-local government abnormalities in other languages.

=== Scrambling and Word Order ===
Properties of Scrambling in Turkish

In her article, "Scrambling, Subscrambling, and Case in Turkish" (2003), Kornfilt examines the phenomenon of scrambling in Turkish grammar. She examines the role that specificity plays in the interactions between scrambling, subscrambling, and typology of Case. She also observes the extent to which the Specificity Effect is an autonomous, independent principle of grammar. She demonstrates that the Specificity Effect is actually a by-product of other syntactic principles, particularly the Condition on Extraction Domains (CED), which she suggests is itself a by-product of Subajency. Additionally, Kornfilt demonstrates that CED is insufficient in explaining features of Turkish, especially those involving with structural Case. As an alternative, Kornfilt suggests that syntactic incorporation of N's into verbs provides a better account of scrambling in Turkish than CED.

Against scrambling as an instance of "Move-Alpha"

In her article, "Against scrambling as an instance of Move-alpha" (1994), Kornfilt surveys and weighs the popular understandings of scrambling. Namely, she acknowledges two major views about scrambling: according to the first, "scrambling is an instance of Chomsky-adjoining an XP (NP, PP, to a more limited extant also AP or ADV) to VP or to IP (perhaps also AP)" as an instance of movement to an A'-position; the second view proposes that certain sub-cases of scrambling are instances of A-movement. Kornfilt argues that scrambling cannot be explained by any movement account at all. Instead, she proposes a base-generation account that is "not committed to the inadequacies of a non-configurational account of German syntax". She makes use of morphosyntactic and lexical properties that are independently attested in the language.

=== Case Marking ===
Direct Objects In her article, "The case of the direct object in Turkish: Semantics, syntax and morphology" (2005), Kornfilt observes the relationship between semantic parameters and morphological constraints in determining the distribution of the accusative case marker -(y)I in Turkish. She notes that there are two mainstream understandings of the accusative marker. The first considers the marker as an instance of Differentiated Object Marking (DOM). The caveat of this perspective is that it assumes that the case suffix marks a direct object if it is too similar to an "archetypical subject". The second perspective is based on the observation that the accusative marker is closely related to the direct object's specificity, instead of to the similarity of the direct object to a typical subject. Kornfilt argues that neither of these perspectives give a satisfying explanation for the distribution of the accusative case marker. Alternatively, Kornfilt insists that the suffix explicitly indicates specificity under certain morpho-syntactic conditions, instead of a mere contrast to the subject. This proposal is a more flexible notion of specificity in terms of "referentially anchored indefinite NPs". This ultimately means that the accusative case marker can indicate the referential property of the direct object, including specificity, according to certain morphological environments in a predictable manner; in other contexts, it is not a reliable indicator of properties like specificity.

== Selected works ==
- Turkish. London: Routledge. 2000. ISBN 978-0-415-00010-9. OCLC 257231515.
