= Projective =

Projective may refer to

== Mathematics ==
- Projective geometry
- Projective space
- Projective plane
- Projective variety
- Projective linear group
- Projective module
- Projective line
- Projective object
- Projective transformation
- Projective hierarchy
- Projective connection
- Projective Hilbert space
- Projective morphism
- Projective polyhedron
- Projective resolution

== Psychology ==
- Projective test
- Projective techniques

== See also ==
- Projection (disambiguation)
- Projector (disambiguation)
- Project (disambiguation)
- Proform, which covers proadjective
- Adjective
- Injective
- Surjective
