= Subject side parameter =

Parameter in generative linguistics

The subject-side parameter, also called the specifier–head parameter, is a proposed parameter within generative linguistics which states that the position of the subject may precede or follow the head. In the world's languages, Specifier-first order (i.e., subject-initial order) is more common than Specifier-final order (i.e., subject-final order). For example, in the World Atlas of Linguistic Structures (WALS), 76% of the languages in their sample Specifier-first (either SOV or SVO). In this respect, the subject-side parameter contrasts with the head-directionality parameter. The latter, which classifies languages according to whether the head precedes or follows its complement, shows a roughly 50-50 split: in languages that have a fixed word order, about half have a Head-Complement order, and half have a Complement-Head order.

== History ==
First developed in the late 1960s and later introduced in his Lectures on Government and Binding (1981), Noam Chomsky presented his work on principles and parameters. Originally, it was not understood if word order was distinct from head order, but this was later proven by Flynn and Espinal using the case of Chinese and English showing the need for a subject side parameter.

== Statistics ==
The following are 6 possible word orders that we can find across human languages. WALS, the World Atlas of Language Structures, presents a statistical estimation on languages with their own word orders.

Word Orders	Percentage		
SOV	41.03%	Subject-initial	Specifier-Head
SVO	35.44%	Subject-initial	Specifier-Head
VSO	6.90%	Subject-medial	Head-Specifier
VOS	1.82%	Subject-final	Head-Specifier
OVS	0.79%	Subject-final	Head-Specifier
OSV	0.29%	Subject-medial	Specifier-Head

The WALS database indicates that languages with the order subject-object-verb (SOV) and subject-verb-object (SVO) are overwhelmingly the most numerous. WALS cites there are 189 languages that have no dominant word order. However, taking this data into account as it is the most complete source of language structure data, X-bar Theory states that underlying structure will differ from surface structure, especially in languages that have seemingly non-dominant structures. Additionally, WALS data appears to lack any data on Amerindian languages or signed languages.

The relative frequencies of word order as follows: 
SOV = SVO > VSO > VOS = OVS > OSV[4]

== Theories in word ordering ==
=== Subject-initial order ===
==== SVO ====
Using WALS data, subject-verb-object languages, such as English, French and Mandarin, are the second most populous languages in the world at 35.44% of the world's languages. One example of SVO language is an Old French example:

SVO word order

Car je croi qu'elle soit morte de duel
because I think-1SG:PRES that she die-3SG:SBJV.PERF from pain
'Because I think that she died from sorrow.' (Lahousse, 2012 p. 392 (4a))

In this sentence, the subject noun phrase je comes at the beginning of the sentence, the verb croi comes the next and then the object noun phrase qu'elle... follows to form SVO word order. If we were to topicalize the object, then we would have two noun phrases before the verb, which will cause the ambiguity on which of the two noun phrases is the subject and which is the object.

==== SOV ====
Subject-object-verb is another common sentence structure found in many languages. SOV has been thought to be the most "unmarked" word order and assumed to be the base of the other word orders according to X-bar Theory. Similarly, in two well-known studies done by Li and Thompson (1975), it is suggested that SOV word order codes definite object. Japanese and Korean are some languages that use SOV word order. In Korean, the subject comes at the beginning of the sentence, followed by the object and then the verb. For example:

SOV word order

na-n Yenghi po-ass-e
I-TOP Yenghi see-PAST-DEC
'I saw Yenghi.' (Lee, 2007 p. 3 (3a))

Above, the subject na comes at the beginning of the sentence, the object Yenghi follows and then the verb po-ass-e comes at the end. This forms SOV word order.

=== Subject-medial order ===
==== VSO ====
Verb-subject-object structure is thought to be derived from the SVO structure. Examples of VSO languages are Welsh and Arabic. The rarity of this word order may be occur as a result of this language occurring when V-fronting moves the verb out of the verb phrase in the SVO structure and places it before the subject This modification disrupts the underlying X-bar structure and thus makes VSO rarer due to the complexity of grammar. Thus, there is no X-bar Theory tree form for this. The subject position in VSO languages is not properly governed, in that it can sway between VSO and SVO.

Alternately, there is evidence that many languages with a VSO word order can take on SVO as an alternate word order. There is evidence of the underlying structure in VSO languages being SVO. For example, in Welsh, there is a SVO structure occurring after auxiliaries but otherwise the sentence structure is VSO. Below are two synonymous examples from Welsh. Example 5 shows a sentence with VSO structure and example 6 shows a sentence with SVO structure:

VSO word order

Gwelodd Sion ddraig.
saw-3SG.PST John dragon
'John saw a dragon.' (Sproat, 1985 : 176(3a))

Gwnaeth Sion weld draig
did-3SG.PST John see dragon
'John saw a dragon.' (Sproat, 1985 : 176(3b))

==== OSV ====
Object-subject-verb is the rarest sentence structure compared with the above sentence structures. No languages are identified as having a basic OSV structure, however it is thought that some Amazonian languages do. There are some languages that are identified as having some OSV sentence structures. Some of these languages are American Sign Language (ASL), English and German. However, ASL, like many others, does not consistently utilize an OSV structure. Sometimes if the verb is relating to aspect, it can adopt an SOV structure. Here is an example of the order in which someone would sign:

7. TOMATO GIRL EAT+durative
  'The girl ate tomatoes for a long time.'
   (Matsuoka, 1997: 131(7)) 

One possibility that can explain the rarity of these languages, is that, in general, objects do not occur in initial position often. Subjects occur more often in initial position. This is why SVO and SOV are more common than both OSV and OVS.

The word order of OSV does not fit with the current X-bar Theory and therefore we can not draw a tree. There is some undetermined movement that occurs or the tree structure may be altered so that the subject may be the sister of the verb.

=== Subject-final order ===
==== VOS ====
Verb-object-subject is an uncommon sentence structure. Languages being classified to this structure are Malagasy and Ch'ol. In these languages, it is mainly divided into two parts: subject and predicate. In Malagasy, the position in a sentence is related to the degree of topicalization. The normal word order is that subject is preceded by predicate. The following example is in Malagasy.

VOS word order

Manana omby mena aho
have cow red I
'I have a red cow.' (Dahl, 1996 p. 168 (3))

One of the explanations for such word order is that there is a movement occurred in the sentence structure. Specifically, the movement is phrasal fronting as proposed by Jessica Coon in her paper focusing on Ch'ol, but it is very likely to be used to explain other languages having VOS word order. This proposal is a result of moving the verb phrase to a higher position in a syntactic tree form. The verb phrase is assumed to move to the specifier position of tense phrase. The reasons why there is a verb phrase movement is based on two main factors: agreement features on tense phrase and restriction on head movement. The whole verb phrase movement acts as the last resort because the language disallows only the head to move. It must take the whole phrase to move instead. In addition, Diana Massam also proposed that the Extended Projection Principle can be taken in account for the verb phrase movement, given the [+predicate] feature on the tense phrase.

==== OVS ====
Object-verb-subject is a minority sentence structure. There are some South American languages such as Hixkaryana and Urarina that have this uncommon structure. The following example is from Hixkaryana:

OVS word order

kana yanimno biryekomo
fish he-caught-it boy
'The boy caught a fish.' (Derbyshire & Pullum, 1981 p. 194 (1a))

Desmond C. Derbyshire suggested that this word order in Hixkaryana is based on its native-speakers' intuitions and statistical evidence. These two pieces of evidence show that the object is followed by a verb and the subject occurs in final position. On the other hand, Laura Kalin proposed there are three factors to make movement occur in the sentence structure: focus, contrastive topic and wh-questions. This is the driving force to make the verb phrase move to initial position.

== Why are some word orders more common? ==
Though there are logically 6 possible word orders — namely SVO, SOV, VOS, OVS, VSO and OSV — some orders are more common than others. There are research and studies been done in order to account for such phenomenon; a few of the possible reasons are as follows:

In Matthew Hall, Victor Ferreira and Rachel Mayberry's paper, they argue that because there are three constraints — being efficient, keeping subjects before objects, avoiding SOV for reversible events — that the SVO word order can allow its users, it becomes more popular than others. Moreover, they claim that when gestural consistency and a passive interlocutor were both present, the SVO word order will appear significantly. Meanwhile, according to Luke Maurits, Amy Perfors and Daniel Navarro, the reason for object-initial languages to be less common than other word orders could be explained by the effects of Uniform Information Density (UID). They suggest that "object-first word orders lead to the least uniform information density in all three of [their] estimated event distributions"(Maurits et al., 2010, p. 7), and was therefore least common. On the other hand, a stimulation study on word order bias also demonstrates that local syntax is one of the triggers of bias towards SOV/SVO word orders; furthermore, the global syntax is also constrained by language encoded semantic structures.

== Principle of Semantic Interpretation ==
Keenan (1978) postulates a Principle of Semantic Interpretation, which aims to explain why subject–predicate order is more common than predicate–subject order among the languages of the world.

Principle of Semantic Interpretation: The meaning of the predicate phrase often depends on the reference of the subject.

Whereas a noun has a relatively fixed meaning (usually referring to a specific object in space), the meaning of a verb or adjective is sometimes disambiguated by the noun upon which it is predicated.

One example of this phenomenon is the verb run. This verb has a different meaning in each of the following sentences, determined by the respective subject:

The children are running.
The fish are running.
The buses are running today.
This watch is running.
The colors are running.
The water is running.
The stockings are running.
My nose is running.

In a language with predicate–subject order, a listener must wait for the subject in order to correctly disambiguate the intended meaning of the predicate. Thus, Keenan proposes that subject–predicate order is intuitively preferable to predicate–subject order.

Keenan also suggests that this principle has an ontological basis rather than a purely semantic one: objects can exist independently of properties that are ascribed to them, but properties cannot exist independently of objects that exemplify them.

== Changes over time ==
In some languages, there is evidence that the dominant word order has changed over time. For example, the dominant word order in Mandarin Chinese and German shifted from SVO to SOV. In Modern Chinese, one factor for this shift is the productivity of compound verbs. This increase in compound verbs lead to an increase in post-positions such as le, bei and ba, which are used as aspect markers.

== See also ==
- Extended Projection Principle
- Principles and parameters
- Word Order
- X-bar theory
- Head-directionality parameter
- Head (linguistics)
- Generative linguistics
- Noam Chomsky
- Transformational grammar
