= Lasnik =

Lasnik is a surname. Notable people with the surname include:

- Andreas Lasnik (born 1983), Austrian footballer
- Howard Lasnik (born 1945), University Professor in the Department of Linguistics at the University of Maryland
- Robert S. Lasnik (born 1951), American attorney and jurist
