= Film projector (disambiguation) =

A film projector is an opto-mechanical device for displaying motion picture film by projecting it onto a screen.

Film projector may also refer to:

- Slide projector, an optical device for projecting enlarged images of photographic slides onto a screen
- Video projector, an image projector that receives a video signal and projects the corresponding image onto a projection screen using a lens system

== See also ==
- Projector (disambiguation)
