= Project (disambiguation) =

A project is an undertaking planned and carried out to achieve a particular aim.

(The) Project may also refer to:

== Arts, entertainment, and media ==
=== Music ===
- Project (album), a 1997 music album by Greg Howe and Richie Kotzen
- The Project (Lindsay Ell album), a 2017 music album by Lindsay Ell
- The Project (Rishi Rich album), a 2006 music album by British producer Rishi Rich

=== Film and television ===
- The Project (Australian TV program), an Australian talk show
- The Project (New Zealand TV programme), a New Zealand talk show
- The Project (film), a British drama

== Brands and enterprises ==
- Microsoft Project, project management software
- Pro-Ject, an Austrian audio equipment manufacturer

== Other ==
- The projects, a colloquial term for subsidized housing in the United States

== See also ==
- Projection (disambiguation)
- Projector (disambiguation)
