= Projection effect =

Projection effect may refer to:

- Front projection effect, in-camera visual effect
- Rear projection effect, in-camera visual effect
- Insolation#Projection effect, the amount of sunlight onto a portion of the Earth relative to its tilt
- In astronomy, a type of observational illusion caused by viewing distant objects or phenomenon from a particular perspective. Examples include superluminal motion, the retrograde motion of the planets, and optical double stars.

== See also ==
- Projection (disambiguation)
- Effect (disambiguation)
