= Trace erasure principle =

The Trace Erasure Principle is a stipulation proposed by Noam Chomsky as part of the Generative-Transformational Grammar. Under the Trace Erasure Principle, traces of a noun phrase (NP) can be replaced only by a designated morpheme and not by an arbitrary NP.

The following is an example of this Principle:

A person is here, waiting for you.

can be transformed into:

There is a person here, waiting for you.

and this Principle remains fulfilled.

Both sentences hold the same meaning, because we have designated There to replace a person —both terms are mutually linked—, and the meaning remains.

A case where this principle is not fulfilled can be the following:

Maria loves Mario.

transformed into:

Mario loves Maria.

Obviously, the meaning of the latter is radically different from that of the first. We have replaced Mario with Maria, and their meaning is not linked. We have arbitrarily chosen Mario to replace Maria.

But the following phrase fulfills the Principle:

Maria, who loves Mario.

In this case, who identifies with Maria.
