= Projection (set theory) =

Operation selecting specific components or columns from a set, tuple, or relation

In set theory, a projection is one of two closely related types of functions or operations, namely:

- A set-theoretic operation typified by the $j$^{th} projection map, written $\mathrm{proj}_j,$ that takes an element $\vec{x} = (x_1,\ \dots,\ x_j,\ \dots,\ x_k)$ of the Cartesian product $(X_1 \times \cdots \times X_j \times \cdots \times X_k)$ to the value $\mathrm{proj}_j(\vec{x}) = x_j.$
- A function that sends an element $x$ to its equivalence class under a specified equivalence relation $E,$ or, equivalently, a surjection from a set to another set. The function from elements to equivalence classes is a surjection, and every surjection corresponds to an equivalence relation under which two elements are equivalent when they have the same image. The result of the mapping is written as $[x]$ when $E$ is understood, or written as $[x]_E$ when it is necessary to make $E$ explicit.

== See also ==
- Cartesian product – Mathematical set formed from two given sets
- Projection (mathematics) – Mapping equal to its square under mapping composition
- Projection (measure theory)
- Projection (linear algebra) – Idempotent linear transformation from a vector space to itself
- Projection (relational algebra) – Operation that restricts a relation to a specified set of attributes
- Relation (mathematics) – Relationship between two sets, defined by a set of ordered pairs
