= Howard Lasnik =

American linguist

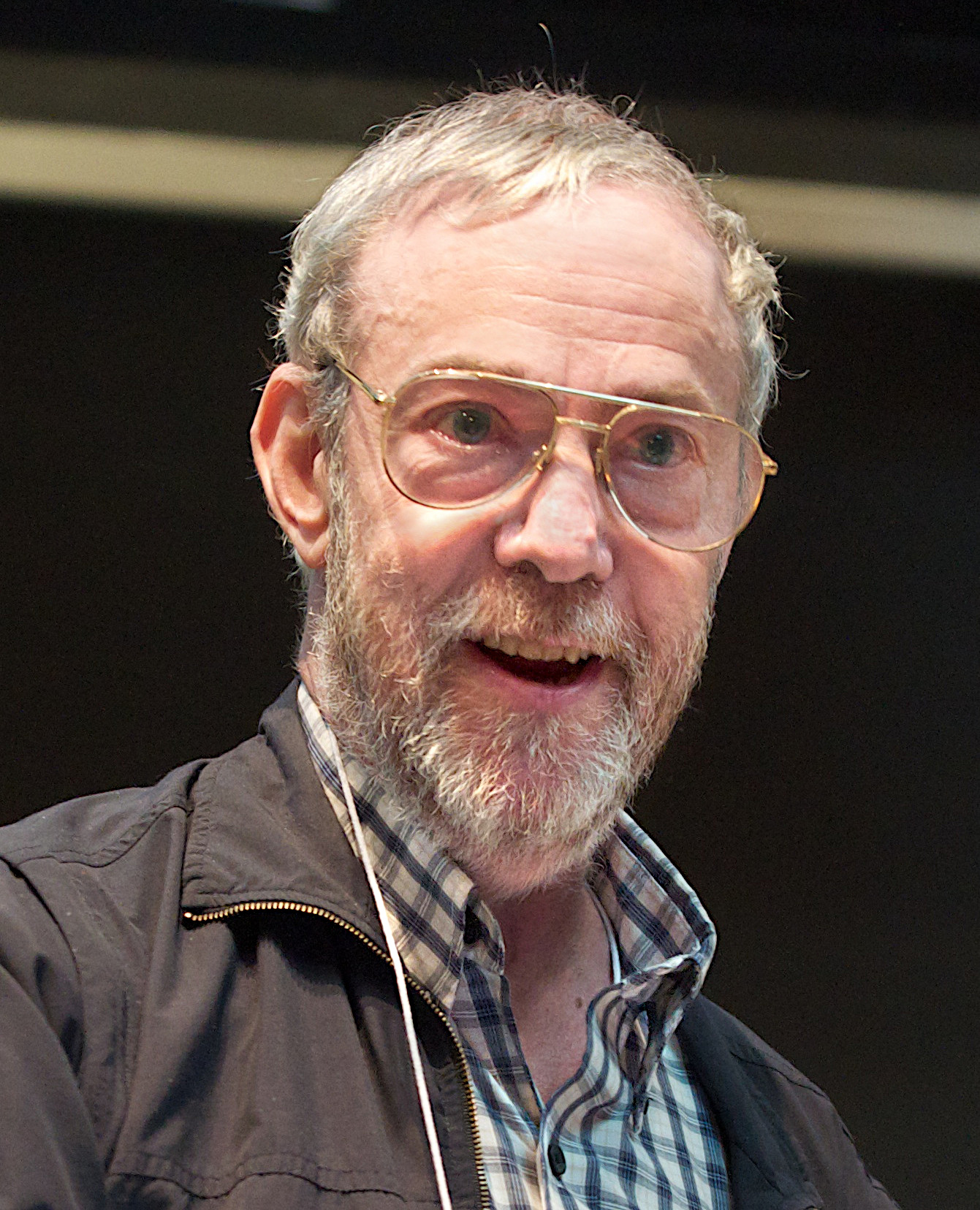
- Born: July 3, 1945 (age 81)
- Education: MIT; Harvard; Carnegie Institute of Technology
- Scientific career
- Fields: Syntax; Generative grammar
- Workplaces: University of Maryland; University of Connecticut
- Doctoral advisor: Noam Chomsky

Howard Lasnik (born July 3, 1945) is a distinguished university professor in the department of linguistics at the University of Maryland.

He studied at the Carnegie Institute of Technology (B.S., 1967), Harvard University (M.A., 1969) and the Massachusetts Institute of Technology (Ph.D., 1972). He joined the faculty of the University of Connecticut in 1972, and took up his present post at the University of Maryland in 2002. He retired in 2023.

Lasnik has been a prominent contributor to the syntax literature within a Chomskyan framework, and is one of only a few linguists to have co-written articles with Noam Chomsky. He describes himself as a "conservative" who often finds himself "trying to resurrect old analyses or maintain current analyses that are being supplanted." Topics he has worked on include anaphora, ellipsis, and Case theory.

Outside linguistics, Lasnik is a Scottish dancer and a table-tennis player. He has also been known as a skilled teacher, both in syntax and in dancing. Two of his semester-long classes have been transcribed as books and published, including interchanges with students. He has also written about his teaching philosophy. He has supervised or co-supervised over 65 dissertations.

== Work ==
Lasnik's dissertation was on the syntax of English negation.

In Binding Theory, Lasnik has been a prominent advocate of an approach to syntactic binding which places an emphasis on semantic reference. He takes the possibility of coreference and disjoint reference to be the targets of explanation in Binding Theory, rather than mere co-indexation. This has led to an incorporation of epithets in formal analyses of anaphora.

He has written extensively on ellipsis phenomena, including sluicing, pseudogapping, and VP-ellipsis. He has advocated a view where the rules of syntax may generate structures which violate syntactic constraints (such as syntactic islands), as long as later operations amend the offending material (at least for some syntactic constraints, such as Subjacency, but not others, like the Empty Category Principle).
