= Projection (measure theory) =

In measure theory, projection maps often appear when working with product (Cartesian) spaces: The product sigma-algebra of measurable spaces is defined to be the finest such that the projection mappings will be measurable. Sometimes for some reasons product spaces are equipped with 𝜎-algebra different than the product 𝜎-algebra. In these cases the projections need not be measurable at all.

The projected set of a measurable set is called analytic set and need not be a measurable set. However, in some cases, either relatively to the product 𝜎-algebra or relatively to some other 𝜎-algebra, projected set of measurable set is indeed measurable.

Henri Lebesgue himself, one of the founders of measure theory, was mistaken about that fact. In a paper from 1905 he wrote that the projection of Borel set in the plane onto the real line is again a Borel set. The mathematician Mikhail Yakovlevich Suslin found that error about ten years later, and his following research has led to descriptive set theory. The fundamental mistake of Lebesgue was to think that projection commutes with decreasing intersection, while there are simple counterexamples to that.

== Basic examples ==
For an example of a non-measurable set with measurable projections, consider the space $X := \{0, 1\}$ with the 𝜎-algebra $\mathcal{F} := \{\varnothing, \{0\}, \{1\}, \{0, 1\}\}$ and the space $Y := \{0, 1\}$ with the 𝜎-algebra $\mathcal{G} := \{\varnothing, \{0, 1\}\}.$ The diagonal set $\{(0, 0), (1, 1)\} \subseteq X \times Y$ is not measurable relatively to $\mathcal{F}\otimes\mathcal{G},$ although the both projections are measurable sets.

The common example for a non-measurable set which is a projection of a measurable set, is in Lebesgue 𝜎-algebra. Let $\mathcal{L}$ be Lebesgue 𝜎-algebra of $\Reals$ and let $\mathcal{L}'$ be the Lebesgue 𝜎-algebra of $\Reals^2.$ For any bounded $N \subseteq \Reals$ not in $\mathcal{L}.$ the set $N \times \{0\}$ is in $\mathcal{L}',$ since Lebesgue measure is complete and the product set is contained in a set of measure zero.

Still one can see that $\mathcal{L}'$ is not the product 𝜎-algebra $\mathcal{L} \otimes \mathcal{L}$ but its completion. As for such example in product 𝜎-algebra, one can take the space $\{0, 1\}^\Reals$ (or any product along a set with cardinality greater than continuum) with the product 𝜎-algebra $\mathcal{F} = \textstyle {\bigotimes\limits_{t\in\Reals}} \mathcal{F}_t$ where $\mathcal{F}_t = \{\varnothing,\{0\} ,\{1\} ,\{0, 1\}\}$ for every $t \in \Reals.$ In fact, in this case "most" of the projected sets are not measurable, since the cardinality of $\mathcal{F}$ is $\aleph_0 \cdot 2^{\aleph_0} = 2^{\aleph_0},$ whereas the cardinality of the projected sets is $2^{2^{\aleph_0}}.$ There are also examples of Borel sets in the plane which their projection to the real line is not a Borel set, as Suslin showed.

== Measurable projection theorem ==
The following theorem gives a sufficient condition for the projection of measurable sets to be measurable.

Let $(X, \mathcal{F})$ be a measurable space and let $(Y, \mathcal{B})$ be a polish space where $\mathcal{B}$ is its Borel 𝜎-algebra. Then for every set in the product 𝜎-algebra $\mathcal{F} \otimes \mathcal{B},$ the projected set onto $X$ is a universally measurable set relatively to $\mathcal{F}.$

An important special case of this theorem is that the projection of any Borel set of $\Reals^n$ onto $\Reals^{n-k}$ where $k < n$ is Lebesgue-measurable, even though it is not necessarily a Borel set. In addition, it means that the former example of non-Lebesgue-measurable set of $\Reals$ which is a projection of some measurable set of $\Reals^2,$ is the only sort of such example.

== See also ==
- Analytic set – subset of a Polish space that is the continuous image of a Polish space
- Descriptive set theory – Subfield of mathematical logic
