= Extended projection principle =

The extended projection principle (EPP) is a linguistic hypothesis about subjects. It was proposed by Noam Chomsky as an addendum to the projection principle. The basic idea of the EPP is that clauses must contain a noun phrase or determiner phrase in the subject position (i.e. in the specifier of a tense phrase or inflectional phrase or in the specifier of a verb phrase in languages in which subjects don't raise to TP/IP, e.g. Welsh).

== Details ==
Most verbs require meaningful subjects—for example, "kick" in "Tom kicked the ball" takes the subject "Tom". However, other verbs do not require (and in fact, do not permit) meaningful subjects—for example, one can say "it rains" but not "the sky rains". The EPP states that regardless of whether the main predicate assigns a meaningful theta role to a subject, a subject must be present syntactically. As a result, verbs that do not assign external theta roles will appear with subjects that are either dummy pronouns (e.g. expletive "it," "there"), or ones which have been moved into subject position from a lower position (e.g., subject of an embedded clause after the verbs, like seem, appear etc. ).

Examples proposed to be the result of expletive subject insertion in accordance with the EPP:

1. It seemed that John would never calm down.
2. It ( rains / snows / hails / etc. ) frequently in Quebec.
3. There seems to be a problem with the radiator.

Notice that in all of these the overt subject has no referential reading.

In languages that allow pro-drop (such as Spanish or Italian), the empty category pro (not to be confused with Big PRO) can fulfill the requirement of the EPP.

McCloskey (1996) proposed that there is one group of languages that lacks the EPP: the VSO languages (like Irish), which appear not only to lack expletives, but also to lack movement operations triggered by the EPP.

The Czech language, in addition to being a pro-drop language, has a number of sentential structures which lack subject at all:

- Prší. (It rains).
- Připozdívá se (It's getting late.)
- Došlo k výbuchu. (An explosion occurred.)
- Zželelo se jim ho. (They took pity on him.)

It has been proposed that in Japanese, the EPP may be met by the subject moving to Spec,TP, or the object (Miyagawa 2001; see also Kuroda (1988)).

[Taroo-ga [hon-o yonda]]

Taro-NOM  book-ACC read 'Taro read a book.'

[Hon-o [ Taroo-ga yonda]]

book-ACC Taro-NOM read  'The book, Taro read.'

In the second order, OSV, there is evidence that the subject, Taroo-ga, stays in the vP, because the EPP has been met by the object, Hon-o, having moved to the Spec,TP.

== See also ==
- Null-subject language
- Pro-sentence
