= Projection principle =

Aspect of generative grammar theory in linguistics

In linguistics, the projection principle is a stipulation proposed by Noam Chomsky as part of the phrase structure component of generative-transformational grammar. The projection principle is used in the derivation of phrases under the auspices of the principles and parameters theory.

== Details ==
Under the projection principle, the properties of lexical items must be preserved while generating the phrase structure of a sentence. The principle, as formulated by Chomsky in Knowledge of Language: Its Nature, Origin and Use (1986), states that "lexical structure must be represented categorically at every syntactic level" (Chomsky 1986: 84). Chomsky further defined the projection principle as "representations at each level of syntax(MF, D, S) are projected from the lexicon in that they observe the subcategorisation properties of lexical items."

This refers to the fact that every individual piece of a syntactic structure is part of a particular category (i.e. “John” is a member of the category Noun and “run” is a member of the category Verb). The Projection Principle requires reference to these categories surfaces at every level of a syntactic phrase structure. This requires a knowledge of arguments and internal structures. “John” may be a noun, but nouns are always dominated by a determiner phrase (DP). The verb “run” does not select for the noun “John”, but rather it selects for the DP “John”. The Projection Principle simply states that when notating the syntactic structure of a sentence such as “John runs fast.”, we must specify at every level what lexical category each piece of the sentence belongs to Two common ways of notating the syntactic structure of a sentence under X-bar Theory include bracketing and tree drawing.

The bracketing for the sentence "John runs fast", generated in line with X-bar Theory, is as follows:

[CP[C'[C e][TP[DP[D'[D e][NP[N'[N John]]]]][T'[T_EPP [V run] [T -s]][VP[VP[<DP>[D'[D <e>][NP[N'[N <John>]]]]][V'[⟨V⟩ ⟨run⟩]]][AP[A'[A fast]]]]]]]]

The tree structure that this bracketing generates can be seen in the figure below.

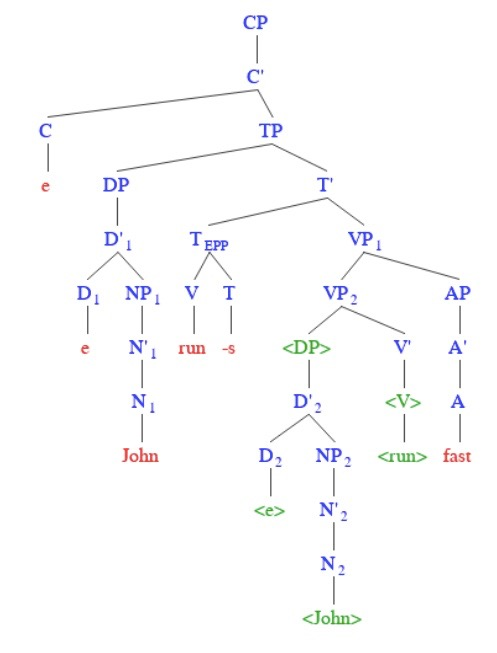

With the visual aid of the tree, the projection principle can more clearly be seen. Looking at the word John (in either position) and following it up through the structure, we see N (noun), followed by N' (pronounced "N Bar": an obligatory representation of the category resulting from the projection principle and X-bar Theory), followed by NP (Noun Phrase). All three of these levels are seen because the projection principle requires that the category of John, Noun, be represented throughout the structure.

The verb run has an obligatory argument, its subject (a DP agent), which must appear in the sentence. The following subcategorization frame for the verb run specifies its properties. The subcategorization frame of run is as follows:

run Verb, [DP agent __ ]

An adverb such as fast has its own subcategorization frame:

fast Adverb, [VP_]

It is out of this frame that a sentence like the following can be generated:

John runs fast.

If either of these subcategorization frames are violated, so is the projection principle, and the utterance would be ill-formed:

*Runs fast.
*John fast.

Before the projection principle was proposed, phrase structures were generated in separation from the properties of lexical entries. These were hypothesized to enter the slots in pre-generated structures waiting to be filled by the lexical material. According to more recent theories, phrase structures are not generated by phrase structure rules, but are "projected" from the lexical entries. The projection principle therefore obviates the need for phrase structure rules in the generative component.

In 1982, Noam Chomsky proposed the extended projection principle as an addendum to the projection principle.

== Locality of Selection ==
Locality of Selection states that properties of lexical items must be satisfied locally within their domain. The local domain is characterized by being the smallest XP with a subject (WP). The properties of the constituent are chosen by the constituent head. A constituent will be incorrect if the lexical requirements are not satisfied. Locality of Selection ensures that when the projection principle occurs, it is satisfied locally (This explains why in the above example; N, N', and NP appear immediately above John).

We see examples of this with certain verbs. With a verb such as “hit” you need a DP that it selects for:

*Mary hit

Mary hit [DP the ball]

In a local domain there are three main levels. The head (X) of the local domain is at the bottom which projects up to and X bar level and then to the XP level. Each head can select for a complement. The X bar level can select for a specifier and the XP level can select for an adjunct. This makes up the basic structure of a local domain. The components of the tree are organized hierarchically. Along with this, the adjunct (YP), specifier (WP) and complement (ZP) are all optional and only used when required

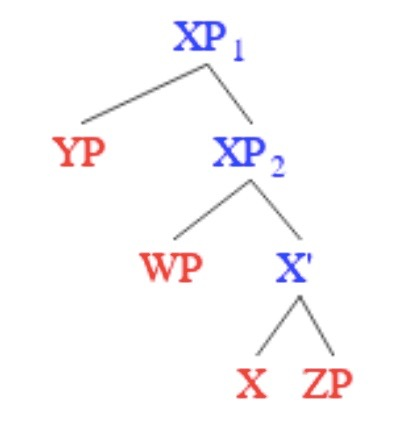

An important thing to acknowledge is that adjuncts are distinct from specifiers and complements in that you can essentially add unlimited adjuncts. An adjunct must be adjoined to the local XP that it is modifying and cannot be referring to another XP in the sentence.

Heads can only take a select few number of complements and a complement must be adjacent to its head. There is a direct relationship between the head and its complement: in other words, a head subcategorises for a complement. A subcategorization frame helps you determine what kind of complement it is. This does not mean, however, that a head must take a complement since there can be zero complements. A head determines the properties of the phrase through projection. Locality, then, shows the local relationship in which the head projects an X-bar level and an XP -phrasal level.

X-bar theory derives a hierarchical vertical structure where XP dominates X’ and X’ dominates X. But the linearity in which complements, specifiers and adjuncts attach can be changed based on the language. Head-initial languages will have the head precede the complement, like in English. Head-final languages, like Japanese and Korean, have the head following the complement. In this way, X-bar theory allows for variation across languages with some having an SOV (subject, object, verb) order while others have an SVO order. Along with this, there are also some language universals that are seen repeatedly in a variety of different languages around the world.

When a phrase or head is in a relationship that is non-local to what selects for it, we see a violation of locality of selection. The underlying structure will need to satisfy selection requirements and locality of selection. But, we also see selection requirements being met through movement. This is especially noticeable when a DP raises to Spec TP through the Extended Projection Principle (EPP).

== Extended Projection Principle ==
The Extended Projection Principle (EPP) refers to the highest Tense Phrase containing a subject. Before the EPP can be satisfied, you must ensure that LOS is satisfied. Once all of the projection principles of LOS are satisfied, EPP is activated when there is movement from one part of the tree to another. This movement allows for the TP to contain a subject.

When generating the tree we must first ensure that all areas of the LOS are correctly projected. This is the tree we would generate to ensure that LOS has been completely satisfied. However, in this tree the EPP is not satisfied as there is no subject present in the TP position.

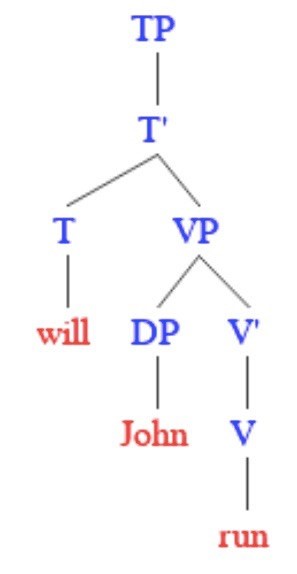

In order to satisfy the EPP we must move the DP John into spec TP, to allow for the TP subject to be filled By moving the DP we are altering the sentence making it John will Run. The EPP will now be satisfied as the DP John is now in the subject position of the TP.

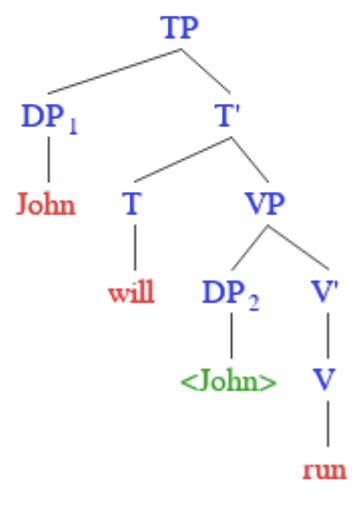

== See also ==
- Extended Projection Principle
- Constituent
- X-bar Theory
- Phrase Structure Rules
- Subcategorization
