= Subjacency =

Subjacency is a general syntactic locality constraint on movement. It specifies restrictions placed on movement and regards it as a strictly local process. This term was first defined by Noam Chomsky in 1973 and constitutes the main concept of the Government and Binding Theory. The revised definition of subjacency from Chomsky (1977) is as follows: "A cyclic rule cannot move a phrase from position Y to position X (or conversely) in … X … [α… [β… Y … ] … ] … X …, where α and β are cyclic nodes. Cyclic nodes are S and NP", (where S=Sentence and NP=Noun Phrase).

This principle states that no movement can move an element over more than one bounding node at a time. In more recent frameworks, bounding nodes which are hurdles to movement are AgrP (Agreement phrase) and DP (Determiner phrase) (S and NP in Chomsky’s definition respectively). Therefore, Subjacency condition limits movement by defining bounding nodes. It also accounts for the fact that all movements are local.

== The subjacency condition in examples ==
The notion of bounding was first observed in the early generative grammar by, for instance, John R. Ross (1967). He noticed that movement is impossible out of certain phrases called Extraction islands. This evidence was further interpreted in terms of the Government and Binding Theory and Subjacency condition in the following way:

(1) who_{i} did [_{AGRP} Bill think [_{CP} t_{i} [_{AGRP} John saw t_{i} ]]]

(2) *who_{i} did [_{AGRP} John ask [_{CP} when_{j} [_{AGRP} t_{i} fixed the car t_{j} ]]]

(3) *who_{i} did [_{AGRP} John believe [_{DP} the statement [_{CP} t_{i} that [_{AGRP} Bill hit t_{i} ]]]]

In (1) the wh-element moves out of the object position of the embedded clause via cyclic movement, crossing only one AgrP at a time. Thereby, it respects the Subjacency condition and the sentence is grammatical. The details of this movement are presented in the diagram below:

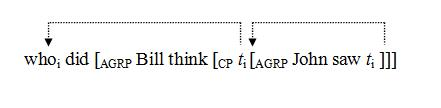
(1)

As the specifier of CP position is empty in (1), the wh-element may use it as an escape hatch before moving further. In the example (2), on the other hand, the specifier of CP position is already taken and the wh-element moves over two AgrP at a time, violating the Subjacency condition and yielding the ungrammatical sentence.
