= Projector (disambiguation) =

A projector is a device that projects an image on a surface.

Projector may also refer to:

== Computing ==
- Projector PSA, a software and cloud-computing company
- Projector, a version control system used in the Macintosh Programmer's Workshop

== Weaponry ==
- Projector, a type of mortar
  - Livens Projector
  - PIAT (Projector, Infantry, Anti Tank), British Second World War spigot mortar
- Holman Projector
- Northover Projector

== Other uses ==
- Projector (business)
- Projector (Dark Tranquillity album), 1999
- Projector (Geese album), 2021
- Projector (patent), the original inventor to reduce an invention to practice
- In mathematics, a projection operator
- The Projector, a Singaporean cinema chain

== See also ==
- Corporate promoter or projector, e.g. in the phrase "railway projectors"
- Projection (disambiguation)
