= Coercion (disambiguation) =

Coercion is the practice of compelling a person to behave in an involuntary way.

Coercion may also refer to:

- Coercion castle, a heavily fortified, medieval castle
- Coercion (linguistics), reinterpretation of a lexeme
- Coercive function, mathematical function that "grows rapidly" at the extremes of the space on which it is defined
- Type conversion, in programming, is changing an entity of one data type into another
- Coercion Acts, Acts of the British parliament to suppress disorder, often in Ireland
- Coercivity, intensity of magnetic field needed to demagnetize a material
- Coercive diplomacy
