= Nooj =

Nooj may refer to:

- NooJ, a computer program for natural language processing
- Nooj, a characters of Final Fantasy X and X-2
