= Early Childhood Research Quarterly =

- Discipline: Early childhood education and development
- Language: English
- Edited by: Laura Justice

Publication details
- History: 1986-present
- Publisher: Elsevier
- Frequency: Quarterly
- Impact factor: 3.719 (2020)

Standard abbreviations
- ISO 4: Early Child. Res. Q.

Indexing
- ISSN: 0885-2006
- OCLC no.: 12603670

Early Childhood Research Quarterly is an academic journal providing current research (predominantly empirical) in the field of early childhood (birth through eight years of age) education and development that was established in 1986. The journal also publishes occasional book reviews, practitioner/policy perspectives, and research reviews. Its focus is on education, policy, and social relevance, seeking links between research and practice. The journal is published four times a year by Elsevier and sponsored by the National Association for the Education of Young Children. Its previous publishers were Pergamon Press and Ablex Publishing. The editor in chief is Laura Justice (Ohio State University). Previous editors include Adam Winsler (George Mason University), Karen E. Diamond (Purdue University) and the founding editor was Lilian G. Katz.
