= Lingvisticae Investigationes =

- Discipline: Linguistics
- Language: English, French
- Edited by: Cédrick Fairon, Louise-Amélie Cougnon, Béatrice Lamiroy and Duško Vitas

Publication details
- History: 1977–present
- Publisher: John Benjamins Publishing Company
- Frequency: Biannually

Standard abbreviations
- ISO 4: Lingvist. Investig.

Indexing
- ISSN: 0378-4169 (print); 1569-9927 (web)
- LCCN: 79642331
- OCLC no.: 301668320

Links
- Journal homepage; Online archive

Lingvisticae Investigationes: International Journal of Linguistics and Language Resources is a peer-reviewed academic journal of linguistics published by John Benjamins Publishing Company. It publishes articles, book reviews, and summaries of PhD theses. The founding editor-in-chief was Maurice Gross (1977–2001). Former editors include Annibale Elia, Gaston Gross, Christian Leclère, and Elisabete Ranchhod.

The former subtitle of the journal was Revue internationale de linguistique française et de linguistique générale ("International Journal of French Linguistics and General Linguistics"). Contributions are in English or in French. The title means "linguistic research" in Latin.

== Abstracting and indexing ==
The journal is abstracted and indexed in:

- European Reference Index for the Humanities
- MLA International Bibliography
- International Bibliography of Book Reviews in Scholarly Literature in the Humanities and Social Sciences
- International Bibliography of Periodical Literature
- Cultures, Langues, Textes
- Germanistik
- Language Abstracts
- Linguistic Bibliography/Bibliographie Linguistique
