= Jerry Hobbs =

American philosopher

- Born: January 25, 1942 (age 84)
- Education: New York University
- Awards: Association for Computational Linguistics Lifetime Achievement Award (2013)
- Scientific career
- Fields: Computer sciences
- Workplaces: SRI International Artificial Intelligence Center
- Doctoral advisor: Jacob T. Schwartz; Naomi Sager

Jerry R. Hobbs (born January 25, 1942) is an American researcher in the fields of computational linguistics, discourse analysis, and artificial intelligence.

== Education ==
Hobbs earned his doctor's degree from New York University in 1974 in computer science and has taught at Yale University and the City University of New York.

== Career ==
From 1977 to 2002 he was with the Artificial Intelligence Center at SRI International, Menlo Park, California, where he was a principal scientist and program director of the Natural Language Program. He has written numerous papers in the areas of parsing, syntax, semantic interpretation, information extraction, knowledge representation, encoding commonsense knowledge, discourse analysis, the structure of conversation, and the Semantic Web.

He is the author of the book Literature and Cognition, and was also editor of the book Formal Theories of the Commonsense World. He led SRI's text-understanding research, and directed the development of the abduction-based TACITUS system for text understanding, and the FASTUS system for rapid extraction of information from text based on finite-state automata. The latter system constituted the basis for an SRI spinoff, Discern Communications. In September 2002 he took a position as senior computer scientist and research professor at the Information Sciences Institute, University of Southern California. He has been a consulting professor with the Linguistics Department and the Symbolic Systems Program at Stanford University.

He has served as general editor of the Ablex Series on Artificial Intelligence. He is a past president of the Association for Computational Linguistics, and is a Fellow of the American Association for Artificial Intelligence. In January 2003 he was awarded an honorary Doctorate of Philosophy from the University of Uppsala, Sweden. In August 2013 he received the Association for Computational Linguistics Lifetime Achievement Award.

== Works ==
1. Literature and Cognition (Lecture Notes, Center for the Study of Language and Information, Jul 9, 1990)
2. Local Pragmatics (Technical note, SRI International, 1987)
3. Commonsense Metaphysics and Lexical Semantics (Technical note, SRI International, 1986)
4. An Algorithm for Generating Quantifier Scopings (Report, Center for the Study of Language and Information, 1986)
5. Formal Theories of the Commonsense World (Ablex Series in Artificial Intelligence, Vol. 1, Jun 1985, with Robert C. Moore)
6. On the Coherence and Structure of Discourse (Report, 1985)
7. The Coherence of Incoherent Discourse (Report, 1985)
8. Making Computational Sense of Montague's Intensional Logic (Courant computer science report, 1976)
9. A Metalanguage for Expressing Grammatical Restrictions in Nodal Spans Parsing of Natural Language (Courant computer science report, 1974)

Preceded by Charles J. Fillmore	ACL Lifetime Achievement Award; 2013	Succeeded by Robert Mercer
