= Maurice Gross =

French linguist (1934–2001)

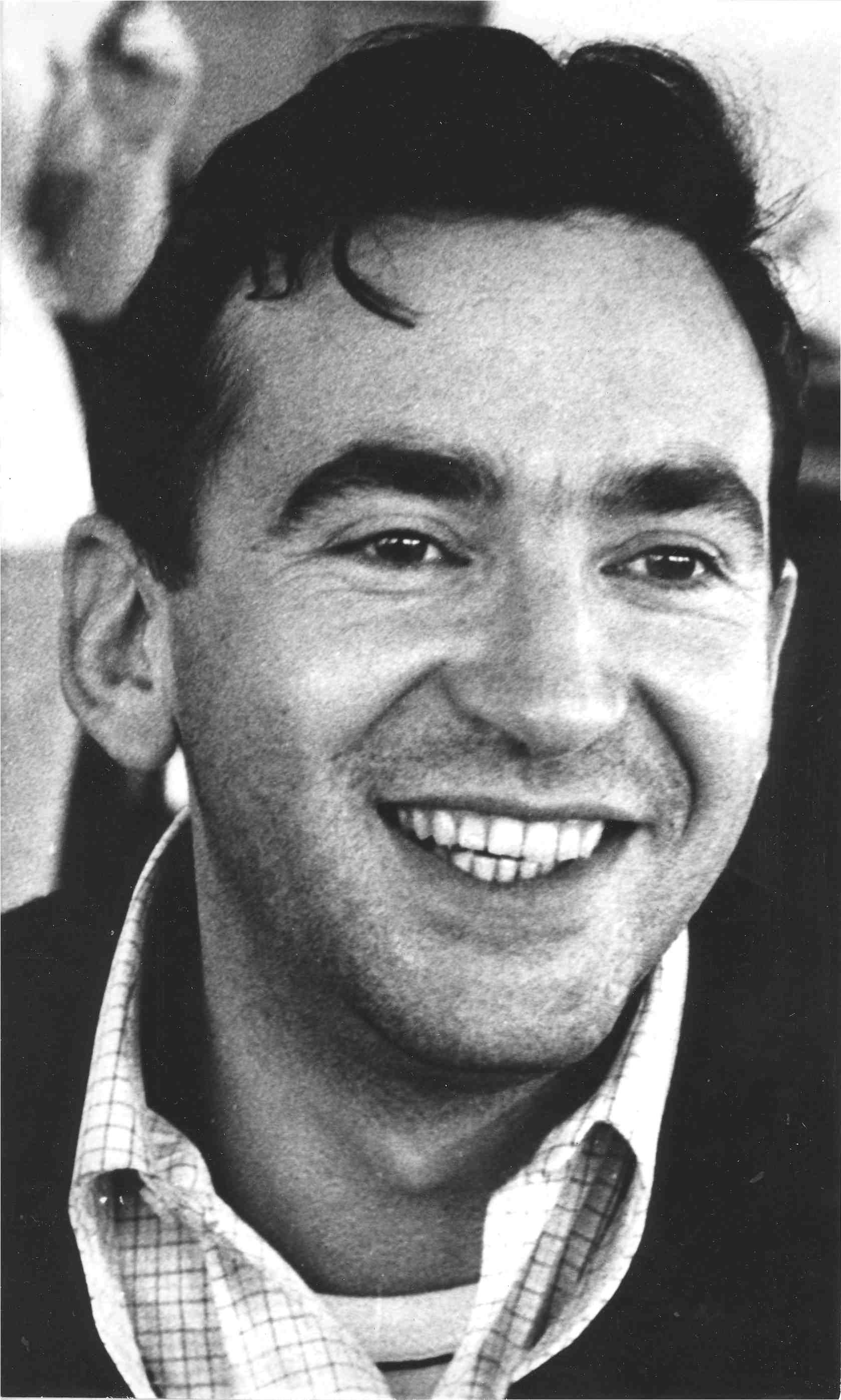
Maurice Gross

Maurice Gross (born 21 July 1934 in Sedan, Ardennes; died 8 December 2001 in Paris) was a French linguist and scholar of Romance languages. Beginning in the late 1960s he developed Lexicon-Grammar, a method of formal description of languages with practical applications.

== Biography ==
Gross worked on automatic translation at the École Polytechnique without prior training in linguistics. This led in 1961 to a scholarship to the Massachusetts Institute of Technology (MIT), where he met Noam Chomsky and became acquainted with Generative grammar. After returning to France, he worked as a computer scientist at the Centre National de la Recherche Scientifique (CNRS). In 1964 he went a second time to the United States, this time to the University of Pennsylvania, where he worked with Zellig S. Harris. He received his research PhD at the Sorbonne in 1967 with his dissertation L'Analyse formelle comparée des complétives en français et en anglais ("Comparative formal analysis of complements in French and English"). He went on as a lecturer at the University of Aix-en-Provence, where he worked with Jean Stéfanini. In 1969 he received his teaching doctorate (habilitation) at the University of Paris with defense of his thesis Lexique des constructions complétives, published under the title Méthodes en syntaxe (Paris : Hermann, 1975). He was appointed professor at the new University of Vincennes (which was later Paris VIII), then at the University of Paris VII.

In 1968, he founded the Laboratoire d'Automatique Documentaire et Linguistique (LADL, the CNRS), and in 1977 the journal Lingvisticae Investigationes.

At the age of 67, while completing an essay explicating a fundamental principle in the work of his mentor, Maurice Gross succumbed to bone cancer.

== Contributions ==
Gross's work, and that of the LADL, gives priority to the principles of methodological rigor, respect for data, empirical observation, comprehensive coverage of a language, and reproducibility of experiments. A systematic description of simple sentences of French yielded a dictionary based on the syntax identifying properties of words salient for parsing and grammatical tagging, and providing a reasoned and detailed classification of most of the elements of the French language. Indeed, before generative grammar adopted the Projection Principle or the Theta criterion, Gross had undertaken the systematic investigation of the interdependence of lexical entries and grammatical rules. It was for this reason that his methods and results were given the name Lexicon-Grammar. His students have verified this working hypothesis in many typologically diverse languages, including not only Romance languages and German, but also Modern Greek, Korean, Arabic, Malagasy, and other languages.

The work of the LADL was greatly enhanced by the use of computers, beginning in the 1980s. One result was a morpho-syntactic "electronic dictionary" of French. In parallel, taking finite automata as the competence model of language, Gross developed the concept of local grammar. Local grammars, consisting of finite automata coupled with morpho-syntactic dictionaries, support automatic text analysis by the closed-source Intex software developed by Max Silberztein and, after Maurice Gross's life by the open source Unitex implemented by the Gaspard-Monge Computer Science Laboratory (LIGM) and the open source NooJ software developed at the Université de Franche-Comté.

Concurrently, Gross was working on problems that he considered fundamental to linguistics, although they had long been neglected in the field, such as lexical ambiguity, idioms and collocations, and "support verb" constructions. In 1976 he discovered the "double scan" property of certain support verb constructions, which systematically identifies idioms. Gross's computer-assisted research on large amounts of linguistic material led to a picture of language as an instrument that is freely manipulated yet highly constrained idiomatically, a result that is consistent with the distinction between the Idiom Principle and the Open Choice Principle found by corpus linguist John McHardy Sinclair (1933 -2007). Gross described the organization of language as a lexicon-grammar, and argued that any grammar must fail if its formalization fails to take into account its dependence on the lexicon. He demonstrated that to fully describe a language one must collect a huge quantity of tagged word combinations.

The facts registered in the dictionaries and grammars resulting from such collection are useful for natural language processing and in particular for deep linguistic processing.

Gross's students include Alain Guillet, Christian Leclère, Gilles Fauconnier, Morris Salkoff, Joëlle Gardes, Bertrand du Castel, Annibale Elia, Jean-Pierre Sueur, Laurence Danlos, Hong Chai-song, Cheng Ting-au, Claude Muller, Eric Laporte, Denis Maurel, Max Silberztein, Tita Kyriacopoulou, Elisabete Ranchhod, Anne Abeillé, Mehryar Mohri, Emmanuel Roche, Nam Jee-sun, Jean Senellart, and Cédrick Fairon.

== Selected writings ==
A complete bibliography of the writings of Maurice Gross is available. Below is a brief selection.

=== As author ===
Papers

- (1979) "On the failure of generative grammar". Language. Journal of the Linguistic Society of America, 55:4.859–885. ISSN 0097-8507.
- (1981) "Les bases empiriques de la notion de prédicat sémantique". Langages, 63, pp. 7-52.
- (1993) "Les phrases figées en français". L'information grammaticale, 59.36–41. ISSN 0222-9838.
- (1994) "Constructing Lexicon-Grammars". Computational Approaches to the Lexicon, Oxford, Oxford University Press, pp. 213-263, doi: 10.1093/oso/9780198239796.003.0008
- (1997) "The Construction of Local Grammars". Finite-State Language Processing, The MIT Press, pp. 329-352.
- "Etat du lexique-grammaire du français et perspectives d'extension". In: Sylvain Auroux et al. (Eds.): History of the Language Sciences, Vol. 3. De Gruyter, Berlin 2006, pp. 2122–2129. ISBN 978-3-11-016736-8.

Monographs

- Méthodes en syntaxe. Le régime des constructions complétives. Paris: Hermann (1975). ISBN 2-7056-1365-X.
- Grammaire transformationnelle du français. Cantilène, Malakoff.
1. Syntaxe du verbe. 1986. ISBN 2-86973-000-4 (EA Paris 1968).
2. Syntaxe du nom. 1986. ISBN 2-86973-001-2 (EA Paris 1977).
3. Syntaxe de l’adverbe. 1990. ISBN 2-908708-00-0.
- Introduction to formal grammars (Tr. by Morris Salkoff of Notions sur les grammaires formelles, 1967). Springer, Heidelberg (1970) (with André Lentin) ISBN 3-540-05201-1.
- Mathematical models in linguistics. Prentice-Hall, Englewood Cliffs (1972).

=== As editor ===
- Syntaxe transformationnelle du français (Langue Française; Vol. 11). Larousse, Paris 1971 (with Jean Stéfanini).
- Méthodes en grammaire française (Initiation à la Linguistique/B; Bd. 6). Klincksieck, Paris 1976 (with Jean-Claude Chevalier).
- Études de syntaxe française (Langue Française; Vol. 39). Larousse, Paris 1978 (with Christian Leclère)
- Grammaire et histoire de la grammaire. Hommage à la mémoire de Jean Stéfanini. Universität, Aix-en-Provence 1988 (with Claire Blanche-Benveniste and André Chervel).

== Memorials cited ==
- Chevalier, Jean-Claude. 2001. "Maurice Gross, un grand linguiste", Le Monde, 12 décembre 2001. Archive.
- Delamar, Michel. 2001. "Maurice Gross", 12 décembre 2001. Cache.
- Dougherty, Ray. 2001. Maurice Gross Memorial Letter. Archive.
- Ibrahim, Amr Helmy. 2002. "Maurice Gross (1934-2001). À la mémoire de Maurice Gross". Hermès 34.
- Ibrahim, Amr Helmy. 2002. "Maurice Gross : une refondation de la linguistique au crible de l’analyse automatique". TALN.
- Lamiroy, Béatrice, "Maurice Gross (1934-2001)", Travaux de linguistique 1/2003 (no46), p. 145-158. Cache.
- Perrin, Dominique. 2002. "In Memoriam Maurice Gross." Cache.
