= Eva Harris =

American virologist

Eva Harris (born August 6, 1965) is a professor in the School of Public Health at the University of California, Berkeley, and the founder and president of the Sustainable Sciences Institute. She focuses her research efforts on combating diseases that primarily afflict people in developing nations.

== Early life and education ==
Harris is the daughter of linguist Zellig Harris and computer scientist Naomi Sager. She received a BA in biochemical sciences from Harvard University in 1987 and a PhD in molecular and cell biology from the University of California, Berkeley in 1993.

== Career ==
After a post-doctoral fellowship and assistant adjunct professorship at the University of California, San Francisco, Harris joined the faculty at UC Berkeley. There, she developed a multidisciplinary approach for studying the virology, pathogenesis, and epidemiology of dengue fever, the most prevalent mosquito-borne viral disease in humans. Harris' lab studies the mechanism of dengue virus infection of human dendritic cells. The lab is also developing a mouse model to study viral tropism and the immune response to dengue virus infection, to generate a better model of the disease. Harris' fieldwork focuses on molecular and epidemiological field studies of dengue in endemic Latin American countries, particularly in Nicaragua. Ongoing fieldwork projects include clinical and biological studies of severe dengue, a pediatric cohort study of dengue transmission in Managua, and a project on evidence-based, community-derived interventions for prevention of dengue via control of its mosquito vector. Harris is currently initiating studies of dengue pathogenesis in humans, focusing on functional characterization of antibodies and B cell memory response, host gene expression profiling, and viral factors such as quasispecies. Harris is also collaborating with investigators at the UC Berkeley College of Engineering to develop the ImmunoSensor: a novel, rapid, low-cost diagnostic device for point-of-care diagnosis of dengue and other infectious diseases. She served as co-director of the "International Training and Research in Emerging Infectious Diseases" program at the Fogarty International Center from 1997 to 2003.

In 2010, Harris entered into a research agreement with NanoViricides, Inc. (NNVC).

She has published over 150 peer-reviewed articles.

== Humanitarian work ==
While volunteering overseas, Harris noted the lack of resources available to her local peers. Knowing that the technologies and resources needed existed in the developed world, but were unavailable where they were most needed, inspired her to introduce molecular diagnostic techniques and scientific literacy in resource-poor settings. In 1997, Harris received a MacArthur Fellowship for her pioneering work over the previous ten years developing programs, and for working to build scientific capacity in developing countries to address public health and infectious disease issues. To continue and expand this work, Harris founded the Sustainable Sciences Institute in 1998, a San Francisco-based international nonprofit organization that works to improve public health in developing countries, by building local capacity for scientific research on infectious diseases. The Sustainable Sciences Institute partners with researchers in developing countries, offering assistance and mentoring to help them excel in their fields of research.

In 2004, she founded a pediatric cohort in Managua, Nicaragua, with the objective of investigating the epidemiological and immunological behavior of dengue and contributing to the construction of the natural history of the virus. This cohort was of utmost importance during the introduction of new arboviruses in Latin America, managing to describe the epidemiological dynamics of Chikungunya and Zika in Nicaragua. Currently, the pediatric cohort created by Harris is one of the longest-standing cohorts in the study of arboviruses.

Harris is a board member of Hesperian Health Guides, a non-profit health publisher known for its publication, Where There Is No Doctor.

== Awards and honors ==
- 2019 Beijerinck Virology Prize
- 2018 Fellows of ASTMH (FASTMH)
- 2002 Prytanean Faculty Award for outstanding women faculty
- 2002 Global Leader for Tomorrow by the World Economic Forum
- 2002 national recognition award from Minister of Health in Nicaragua for contribution to scientific development
- 2001 Pew Scholar for her work on dengue pathogenesis
- 1997 MacArthur Fellows Program for her scientific capacity building work

== Publications ==
- A Low Cost Approach to PCR: Appropriate Transfer of Biomolecular Techniques, Editor Nazreen Kadir, Oxford University Press US, 1998, ISBN 978-0-19-511926-8
