= Laura Justice =

American psychologist

- Born: October 9, 1968 (age 58)
- Occupation: EHE Distinguished Professor of Educational Psychology
- Awards: 2005 Presidential Early Career Award for Scientists and Engineers

Academic background
- Education: Ohio University (AB, BSEd, PhD)

Laura M. Justice (born October 9, 1968) is a language scientist and expert on interventions to promote children's literacy. She is the EHE Distinguished Professor of Educational Psychology at Ohio State University, where she also serves as the Executive Director of the A. Sophie Rogers School for Early Learning.

Justice received the Presidential Early Career Award for Scientists and Engineers from President George W. Bush in 2005. Justice received this award for her scientific research identifying techniques to raise the reading levels of pre-school children from low socioeconomic households and those identified as having language impairments. This award was the first Presidential Early Career Award to be given in the field of education research. Justice's other awards include the Annie Glenn Leadership Award in Speech-Language Pathology and the Early Career Publication Award from the Division of Research, Council for Exceptional Children.

Justice has authored several books including Scaffolding with Storybooks: A Guide for Enhancing Young Children's Language and Literacy Achievement, Communication Science and Disorders, Clinical Approaches to Emergent Literacy Intervention, The Syntax Handbook: Everything You Learned About Syntax ...(but Forgot) (with Helen K. Ezell), and Engaging Children with Print: Building Early Literacy Skills through Quality Read-Alouds (with Amy Sofka).

Justice has held the position of editor in chief of Early Childhood Research Quarterly, Editor of the American Journal of Speech-Language Pathology, and Editor of the Language, Speech, and Hearing Services in Schools.

== Biography ==
Justice received her Bachelor of Arts degree (1992) and BSEd (1996) from Ohio University. She continued her education there receiving her PhD in Speech Hearing Sciences in 2000 under the advisement of Helen K. Ezell. Justice's early research with Ezell investigated ways parents of children diagnosed with speech delays engaged with their children during story time. Their research revealed that parents' questions to their children about the books tended to focus entirely on the pictures and not on the print. Justice's doctoral dissertation, titled "An experimental evaluation of an intervention to stimulate written language awareness in preschool children from low-income households" initiated a program of research on literacy interventions.

Justice joined the faculty of the School of Education and Human Development (formerly the Curry School of Education) at the University of Virginia where she developed a program of translational research on children's emergent literacy and early interventions to promote reading. She subsequently moved to Ohio State University where serves as the director of the Pre-School Language and Literacy Research Lab and as the CCEC executive director of The Crane Center for Early Childhood Research and Policy.

Justice's research has been funded by numerous grants from agencies including the National Institutes of Health (NIH) and the Institute of Education Sciences. She has been a visiting scholar at the University of Canterbury (supported by an Erskine Fellowship), the University of Zagreb (supported by a Fulbright Scholar Award) and the University of Bologna.

== Research ==
Justice's research has focused on early interventions to support emergent literacy, especially for children growing up in low-income families and for children with specific language impairment (also known as developmental language disorder). Her collaborative research highlights the role of parent involvement in literacy interventions and the need for professional development to support teachers of children growing up in at-risk economic circumstances. Other research has investigated effects of poverty on toddler's early language skills and the impact of quality preschool programs on children's academic gains.

Justice and her collaborators received the ASHA Editor's Award for their 2004 article "Relations among maternal, child, and demographic factors and the persistence of preschool language impairment." This article used data from the National Institute of Child Health and Human Development Study of Early Child Care to examine language outcomes of children, who at the age of 3 appeared to exhibit specific language impairment. At age 4.5, over half of the children show a persistent language impairment, with maternal depression identified as a risk factor in the children's prognosis.

Justice and her colleagues have used shared storybook reading as a context for early intervention, and stress the importance of emphasizing print over pictures while reading to develop children's literacy awareness. Her research team has tied early exposure to picture books to the so-called Million Word Gap.

== Representative publications ==
- Justice, L. M., & Ezell, H. K. (2002). Use of storybook reading to increase print awareness in at-risk children. American Journal of Speech-Language Pathology, 11(1), 17-29.
- Justice, L. M., Kaderavek, J. N., Fan, X., Sofka, A., & Hunt, A. (2009). Accelerating preschoolers’ early literacy development through classroom-based teacher-child storybook reading and explicit print referencing. Language, Speech, and Hearing Services in Schools, 40(1), 67–85.
- Justice, L. M., Mashburn, A. J., Hamre, B. K., & Pianta, R. C. (2008). Quality of language and literacy instruction in preschool classrooms serving at-risk pupils. Early Childhood Research Quarterly, 23(1), 51-68.
- Justice, L. M., Meier, J., & Walpole, S. (2005). Learning new words from storybooks: An efficacy study with at-risk kindergartners. Language, Speech, and Hearing Services in Schools, 36, 17-32.
- Justice, L. M., & Pullen, P. C. (2003). Promising Interventions for Promoting Emergent Literacy Skills: Three Evidence-Based Approaches. Topics in Early Childhood Special Education, 23(3), 99–113.
