= Greenwood Publishing Group =

Educational and academic publisher

ABC-Clio/Greenwood
- Combined ABC-Clio and Greenwood logo
- Parent company: Bloomsbury Publishing
- Status: Defunct
- Founded: 1967
- Founder: Harold Mason
- Successor: Bloomsbury Academic
- Country of origin: United States
- Headquarters location: Santa Barbara, California
- Distribution: Worldwide
- Nonfiction topics: Reference works; scholarly and general-interest; library and teaching materials
- Imprints: Greenwood Press; Greenwood World Publishing; Greenwood Reprint (1967–1980s); Greenwood Electronic Media (2000s); Greenwood Microforms; Ablex Publishing (2000s); Auburn House (1989–2008); Bergin & Garvey (1989–2008); Heinemann USA (1990s–2008); Libraries Unlimited (2000s); Oryx Press (2000s); Praeger Publishers (1986–2008); Quorum Books (1976–2008)
- Official website: www.greenwood.com

Greenwood Publishing Group, Inc. (GPG) was an educational and academic publisher (middle school through university level) that was part of ABC-Clio. Since 2021, ABC-Clio and its suite of imprints, including GPG, are collectively imprints of British publishing house Bloomsbury Publishing. The Greenwood name stopped being used for new books in 2023.

Established in 1967 as Greenwood Press, Inc., and based in Westport, Connecticut, GPG published reference works under its Greenwood Press imprint; and scholarly, professional, and general-interest books under its related imprint, Praeger Publishers (/ˈpreɪɡər/). Also part of GPG was Libraries Unlimited, which published professional works for librarians and teachers. Both of the latter became stand-alone imprints of ABC-Clio, in 2008–2009, after its purchase of GPG.

== History ==
=== 1967–1999 ===
The company was founded as Greenwood Press, Inc. (GPI) in 1967 by Harold Mason, a librarian and antiquarian bookseller, and Harold Schwartz, who had a background in trade publishing. Based in Greenwood, New York, the company initially focused on reprinting out-of-print works, particularly titles listed in the American Library Association's first edition of Books for College Libraries (1967), under the Greenwood Press imprint; and out-of-print periodicals, published with the series name "American Radical Periodicals" under the Greenwood Reprint imprint. In 1969, the company was sold to Williamhouse-Regency, a paper and stationery manufacturing company then on the American Stock Exchange, leading to an expansion of its reprint activities and the establishment of a microform publishing imprint, Greenwood Microforms.

By 1970, the company established a small scholarly monograph project. The same year, Robert Hagelstein, formerly with the Johnson Reprint Corporation division of Academic Press, was hired as vice-president. In 1973, Mason and Schwartz left the company, and Hagelstein was named president, a position he would hold until his retirement at the end of 1999. During those twenty-seven years, the press wound down its reprint activities, diverting its focus to new scholarly, reference, and professional books. This large-scale redirection of the company resulted in the publication of more than 10,000 titles during those years.

On August 25, 1976, the company was sold to the Congressional Information Service (CIS). In 1979, it became part of the Dutch publishing giant Elsevier following the latter's purchase of CIS. That same year, the Greenwood subsidiary initiated its Quorum Books imprint, which published professional titles in business and law.

On January 1, 1986, GPI expanded further when it purchased Praeger Publishers (founded in 1950 as Frederick A. Praeger, Inc.) from CBS, Inc.; and again in 1989 when it acquired Bergin & Garvey and Auburn House.

At the beginning of 1990, the company's name was changed from Greenwood Press, Inc., to Greenwood Publishing Group, Inc. (GPG). When Elsevier merged with Reed International in 1993, GPG became part of Reed Elsevier, and by the mid-1990s the operational part of GPG joined with Heinemann USA, which had been part of Reed.

When Hagelstein retired at the end of 1999, Wayne Smith was named president. Under Smith, GPG made a number of additional acquisitions including the Ablex Publishing, Oryx Press, and Libraries Unlimited imprints, and expanded GPG's online and CD-ROM products under its Greenwood Electronic Media imprint.

=== 2000–present ===
On July 12, 2001, Reed Elsevier completed its acquisition of Harcourt. Harcourt became a wholly owned subsidiary of Reed Elsevier and GPG became part of Harcourt Education.

On December 13, 2007, GPG became part of Houghton Mifflin Company as a result of Houghton's acquisition of Harcourt.

On October 1, 2008, ABC-Clio and Houghton Mifflin Harcourt (HMH) announced an agreement granting ABC-Clio a perpetual license to use the imprints and publish the titles of Greenwood Publishing. (GPG), including Greenwood Publishing, Praeger Publishers (including Praeger Security International), and Libraries Unlimited. In addition, HMH would also transfer certain assets, including copyrights, contracts, and inventory, of Greenwood Publishing Group to ABC-Clio. This agreement became effective immediately. The 88 Post Road West office in Westport, Connecticut, was closed as a result; layoffs began in December 2008. The transfer of GPG to ABC-Clio occurred during 2009.

In December 2021, Bloomsbury Publishing bought ABC-Clio and with it Greenwood.

== Subsidiaries ==
=== Imprints ===
- Greenwood Press (reference works)
  - Greenwood World Publishing
  - Greenwood Reprint
  - Greenwood Electronic Media
  - Greenwood Microforms

=== Former imprints ===
- Praeger Publishers (scholarly and general interest): Became subsidiary of ABC-Clio.
  - Praeger Security International (international security studies - founded by Heather Ruland Staines and Adam T. Heath): Became subsidiary of ABC-Clio.
- Libraries Unlimited (for libraries and teachers): Became subsidiary of ABC-Clio.
- Ablex Publishing
- Auburn House
- Bergin & Garvey
- Oryx Press
- Quorum Books

=== Former subsidiaries ===
- Heinemann USA

== Selected publications ==
- The Greenwood Encyclopedia of African American Folklore
- The Greenwood Encyclopedia of Science Fiction and Fantasy
