= The Greenwood Encyclopedia of African American Folklore =

- The Greenwood Encyclopedia of African American Folklore, Vol. 3
- Author: Anand Prahlad
- Language: English
- Series: Volume I: A-F; Volume II: G-P; Volume III: Q-Z
- Subject: African-American/Black Culture
- Genre: Reference, Geography and World Cultures/Folklore
- Publisher: Westport, CT: Greenwood Press
- Publication date: 12-30-2005
- Publication place: United States
- Media type: Book, hardcover
- Pages: v. 1. A-F, v. 2. G-P, v. 3. Q-Z: 1672
- ISBN: 978-0-313-33035-3
- Dewey Decimal: 398.0899 G

The Greenwood Encyclopedia of African American Folklore is a three-volume set of books published in December 2005 by Greenwood Press. It contains roughly 700 alphabetically arranged entries by more than 100 contributors. It serves as a comprehensive overview of all aspects of African-American folklore, including folktales, music, foodways, spiritual beliefs, and art.

== Background ==
The Greenwood Encyclopedia of African American Folklore is unique in being the definitive encyclopedia relating to African-American traditions, background, and mores; a comprehensive overview of African-American culture and folklore. It contains alphabetically arranged entries and expert contributors on topics such as folktales, music, art, foodways, spiritual beliefs, proverbs, and many other subjects. Entries cite works for further reading and the encyclopedia concludes with a bibliography of major works.

The set of books also gives attention to the Caribbean and African roots of traditional African-American culture. The three volumes are intended to help scholars and students understand the heart of African-American culture and provides a comprehensive context for African-American history, literature, music, and art.

== Reviews ==
"The fact that more than 100 entries are devoted to scholars and collectors, among them Imamu Amiri Baraka, Zora Neale Hurston, and Melville J. Herskovits, supports a statement Prahlad makes in the introduction. The encyclopedia seeks 'to provide a significant overview of the current study of African American folklore.... [This] first comprehensive general reference work' on African American folklore is highly recommended for academic and public libraries."

"The multidisciplinary nature of folklore studies is reflected in the list of 140 or so primarily academic contributors, whose areas of expertise include art, literature, anthropology, religion, and more....(the entries) make fascinating reading on topics as diverse as samba, the Sea Islands, sermons, Tupac Shakur, Stagolee, and the steel pan drum...."

Booklist, Starred Review
