= Selection (linguistics) =

Predicates' ability to semantically limit arguments

In linguistics, selection denotes the ability of predicates to determine the semantic content of their arguments. Predicates select their arguments, which means they limit the semantic content of their arguments. A distinction may sometimes be drawn between types of selection; viz., s(emantic)-selection versus c(ategory)-selection. Selection in general stands in contrast to subcategorization: selection is a semantic concept, whereas subcategorization is a syntactic one; predicates both select and subcategorize for their complement arguments, but only select their subject arguments.

Selection is closely related to valency, a term used in grammars other than the Chomskian generative grammar for a similar phenomenon.

== Examples ==
The following pairs of sentences illustrate the concept of selection; the # indicates semantic deviance:

a. The plant is wilting.
b. #The building is wilting. – The argument the building violates the selectional restrictions of the predicate is wilting.

a. Sam drank a coffee.
b. #Sam drank a car. – The argument a car contradicts the selectional restrictions of the predicate drank.

The predicate is wilting selects a subject argument that is a plant or is plant-like. Similarly, the predicate drank selects an object argument that is a liquid or is liquid-like. A building cannot normally be understood as wilting, just as a car cannot normally be interpreted as a liquid. The b-sentences are possible only given an unusual context that establishes appropriate metaphorical meaning. The deviance of the b-sentences is thus attributed to violation of those selectional restrictions determined by the predicates is wilting and drank.

When a mismatch between a selector and a selected element triggers reinterpretation of the meaning of those elements, that process is referred to as coercion.

== S-selection vs. c-selection ==
One sometimes encounters the terms s(emantic)-selection and c(ategory)-selection. The concept of c-selection overlaps to an extent with subcategorization. Predicates c-select the syntactic category of their complement arguments—e.g., noun (phrase), verb (phrase), adjective (phrase), etc.; that is, they determine the syntactic category of their complements. In contrast, predicates s-select the semantic content of their arguments; thus, s-selection is a semantic concept, whereas c-selection is a syntactic one. (Note that when the terms selection and selectional restrictions appear without the c- or s- prefixes, they are usually understood to refer to s-selection.)

The b-sentences above do not contain violations of the c-selectional restrictions of the predicates is wilting and drank; they are, rather, well-formed from a syntactic point of view (hence #, not *), for the arguments the building and a car satisfy the c-selectional restrictions of their respective predicates (i.e., in this case, the arguments are required to be nouns or noun phrases). Only the s-selectional restrictions of the predicates is wilting and drank are violated in the b-sentences.

Selectional constraints or selectional preferences describe the degree of s-selection, in contrast to selectional restrictions, which treat s-selection as a binary yes-or-no. Selectional preferences have often been used as a source of linguistic information in natural language processing applications. Thematic fit is a measure of how much a particular word in a particular role (like subject or direct object) matches the selectional preference of a particular predicate. For example, the word cake has a high thematic fit as a direct object for cut.

== C-selection vs. subcategorization ==
The concepts of c-selection and subcategorization overlap in meaning and use to a significant degree. If there is a difference between these concepts, it resides with the status of the subject argument. Traditionally, predicates are interpreted as NOT subcategorizing for their subject argument, because the subject argument appears outside of the minimal VP containing the predicate. Predicates do, however, c-select their subject arguments; e.g.:

Fred eats beans.

The predicate eats c-selects both its subject argument Fred and its object argument beans, but as far as subcategorization is concerned, eats subcategorizes for only its object argument, beans. This difference between c-selection and subcategorization depends, crucially, upon the understanding of subcategorization: an approach to subcategorization that sees predicates as subcategorizing for their subject arguments as well as for their object arguments will draw no distinction between c-selection and subcategorization; the two concepts are then synonymous.

== Thematic relations ==
Selection can be closely associated with thematic relations (e.g. agent, patient, theme, goal, etc.). By limiting the semantic content of their arguments, predicates are determining the thematic relations/roles that their arguments bear.

== Theories ==
Several linguistic theories make explicit use of selection. These include:

- Operator grammar, which makes selection a central part of the theory.
- Link grammar, which assigns a (floating point) log-likelihood "cost" to each context a word can appear in, thus providing an explicit numeric estimate of the likelihood of a parse.

== Literature ==
- Brinton, L. 2000. The structure of modern English. Amsterdam:John Benjamins Publishing Company.
- Carnie, A. 2007. Syntax: A generative introduction, 2nd edition. Malden, MA: Blackwell Publishing.
- Chisholm, W. 1981. Elements of English linguistics. New York: Longman.
- Chomsky, N. 1965. Aspects of the theory of syntax. Cambridge, MA: MIT Press.
- Cowper, E. 1992. A concise introduction to syntactic theory: The government-binding approach. Chicago: The University of Chicago Press.
- Fowler, R. 1971. An introduction to transformational syntax. London: Routledge & Kegan Paul.
- Fromkin, V. (ed.). 2000. Linguistics: An introduction to linguistic theory. Malden, MA: Blackwell Publishers.
- Haegeman, L. and J. Guéron. 1999. English grammar: A generative perspective. Oxford, UK: Oxford University Press.
- Horrocks, G. 1986. Generative Grammar. Longman: London.
- Napoli, D. 1993. Syntax: Theory and problems. New York: Oxford University Press.
- Ouhalla, J. 1994. Transformational grammar: From rules to principles and parameters. London: Edward Arnold.
- van Riemsdijk, H. and E. Williams. 1986. Introduction to the theory of grammar. Cambridge, MA: The MIT Press.
- van Valin, R. 2001. An introduction to syntax. Cambridge, UK: Cambridge University Press.
