= Anne Abeillé =

French linguist (born 1962)

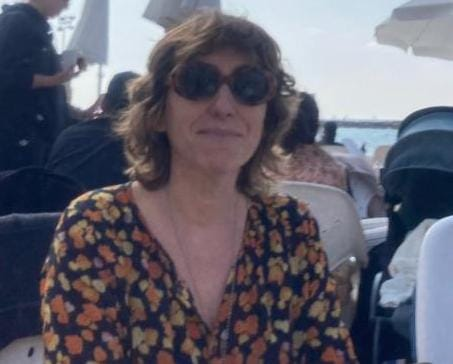
- Born: 13 September 1962 (age 64); Paris, France
- Education: University of Paris 7
- Occupation: linguist
- Known for: French Treebank

Anne Abeillé (born 13 September 1962 in Paris) is a French linguist specialising in French grammar and syntactic theory, in particular constraint-based grammar, as well as natural language processing. She led the creation of the French Treebank, the first syntactically annotated corpus of French.

== Biography ==
From 1983 to 1987, Abeillé studied at the École normale supérieure de Fontenay-Saint-Cloud, where she graduated in modern literature. She subsequently worked with Aravind Joshi as a research assistant at the University of Pennsylvania, where she contributed to the development of Lexicalized Tree-Adjoining Grammar (LTAG). In 1991 she received her PhD supervised by Maurice Gross as well as her habilitation at University of Paris 7. She then taught at Paris 8 University Vincennes-Saint-Denis and Paris Diderot University before becoming full professor at the latter in 2000, as well as member of the Formal Linguistics Laboratory of the French National Centre for Scientific Research, which she has headed since 2011.

== Honours and awards ==
Abeillé is an honorary member of the Institut Universitaire de France, where she was a junior member from 1996 to 2001 and then a senior member from 2012 to 2017. She was awarded a bronze and a silver medal by the French National Centre for Scientific Research in 1995 and 2007 respectively. In 2008 she was elected as an ordinary member of the Academia Europaea. 2008 also saw her knighted as a member of the Legion of Honour, of which she became an officer in 2015.

== Selected publications ==
- Schabes, Yves, Anne Abeillé and Aravind K Joshi. 1988. Parsing Strategies With 'Lexicalized' Grammars: Application to Tree Adjoining Grammars. CIS Technical Reports, University of Pennsylvania.
- Abeillé, Anne. 1993. Les nouvelles syntaxes : grammaires d'unification et analyse du français (New syntaxes: constraint-based grammars and the analysis of French). Coll. Linguistique, Armand Colin, Paris. ISBN 9782200210960
- Rastier, François, Marc Cavazza and Anne Abeillé. 1994. Sémantique pour l'analyse: de la linguistique à l'informatique (Semantics for descriptions: from linguistics to computer science). Masson: Sciences cognitives. ISBN 9782225845376. English translation published with CSLI Publications in 2002, ISBN 9781575863535
- Abeillé, Anne, and Owen Rambow (eds.). 2000. Tree Adjoining Grammars: Formalism, linguistic analysis and processing. Stanford: CSLI Publications. ISBN 9781575862521
- Abeillé, Anne. 2002. Une grammaire électronique du français (An electronic grammar of French). Coll. Sciences du langage, Paris: CNRS Editions. ISBN 9782271058249
- Abeillé, Anne (ed.). 2003. Treebanks: building and using parsed corpora. Dordrecht: Springer. ISBN 9789401002011
- Abeillé, Anne, Lionel Clément and François Toussenel. 2003. Building a treebank of French. In Abeillé (ed.), 165–187.
- Abeillé, Anne. 2007. Les grammaires d’unification (Constraint-based grammars). London: Hermes. ISBN 9782746212510
- Abeillé, Anne, and Olivier Bonami (eds.). 2020. Constraint-Based Syntax and Semantics: Papers in Honor of Danièle Godard. Stanford: CSLI Publications. ISBN 9781684000463
- Abeillé, Anne, and Danièle Godard. 2021. La Grande Grammaire du français (Comprehensive French Grammar). Actes Sud, Editions de l’Imprimerie Nationale. ISBN 9782330142391
