= Bruria Kaufman =

American theoretical physicist (1918–2010)

- ברוריה קאופמן
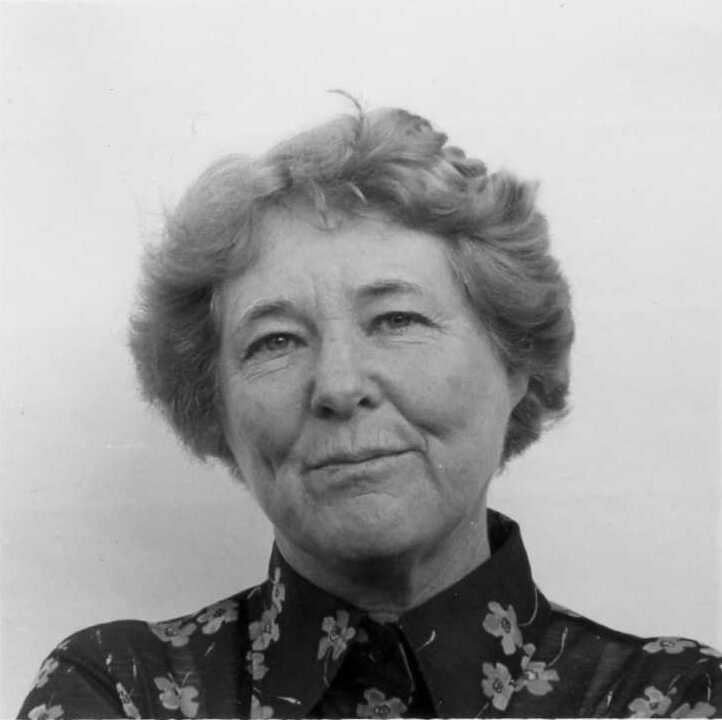
- Born: August 21, 1918; New York City, United States
- Died: January 7, 2010 (aged 91); Haifa, Israel
- Education: Hebrew University of Jerusalem, Columbia University
- Known for: Contributions to general relativity, statistical physics, Ising model, Mössbauer effect
- Scientific career
- Fields: Theoretical Physics
- Workplaces: Institute for Advanced Study, University of Pennsylvania, Weizmann Institute of Science, University of Haifa

Bruria Kaufman (Hebrew: ברוריה קאופמן; August 21, 1918 – January 7, 2010) was an Israeli American theoretical physicist. She contributed to Albert Einstein's general theory of relativity, to statistical physics, where she used applied spinor analysis to rederive the result of Lars Onsager on the partition function of the two-dimensional Ising model, and to the study of the Mössbauer effect, on which she collaborated with John von Neumann and Harry Lipkin.

== Biography ==
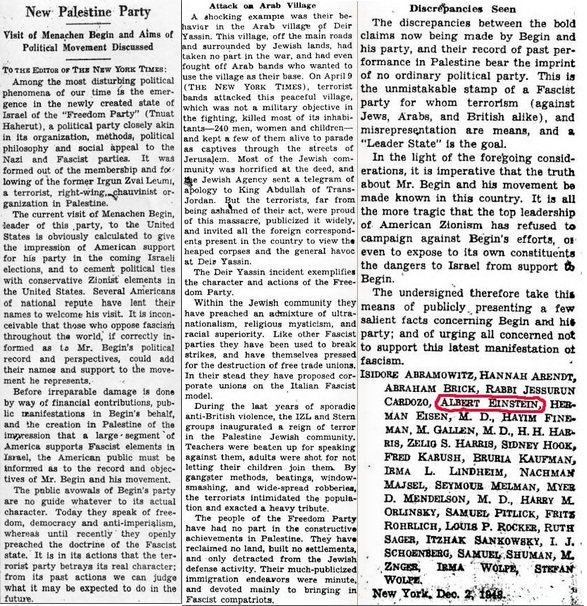
Letter by Albert Einstein, Bruria Kaufman and others criticizing Menachem Begin and his party at the time, Herut.

Bruria Kaufman was born in New York City to a Jewish family of Ukrainian origin. In 1926 the family emigrated to the British Mandate for Palestine, living first in Tel Aviv, and then in Jerusalem. Her main interests during her youth were music and mathematics.

She studied mathematics, earning a B.Sc. from Hebrew University of Jerusalem in 1938, and a PhD from Columbia University in 1948. She married the linguist Zellig S. Harris in 1941.

In 1960, she settled on Kibbutz Mishmar Ha'emek in Israel and adopted a daughter, Tami.

Kaufman returned to the US in 1982. They lived in Pennsylvania, where her husband taught. He died in 1992. Kaufman moved to Arizona and married the Nobel laureate Willis Eugene Lamb in 1996, although the marriage ended in divorce. She died in January 2010 at Carmel Hospital in Haifa, following a stay at a nursing home in Kiryat Tiv'on, not far from Haifa. In keeping with her wishes, her body was cremated.

== Scientific career ==
Kaufman was a research associate at the Institute for Advanced Study in Princeton from 1948 to 1955, where she worked with John von Neumann (1947/48) and with Albert Einstein (1950–1955). She spent the following years at the University of Pennsylvania working on a mathematical linguistics project.

Kaufman returned to Israel in 1960 (with Harris) where she became professor at the Weizmann Institute of Science in Rehovot (1960–1971) and later on at the University of Haifa (1972–1988). Prof. Bruria Kaufman‘s main academic contribution was finding an elegant solution based on group theory to the two-dimensional Ising model, together with Lars Onsager in 1949. This solution was much simpler than the solution published by Onsager himself in 1944. The three dimensional Ising model was not solved until this day. In addition, Kaufman published two articles with Albert Einstein and co-authored his book on relativity. In Israel she studied the Mössbauer effect together with Professor Harri Zvi Lipkin and the two published an article together, in which Bruria combined mathematics with the physics of the effect.

== Selected publications ==
- Kaufman, Bruria (1949-10-15). "Crystal Statistics. II. Partition Function Evaluated by Spinor Analysis". Physical Review. 76 (8). American Physical Society (APS): 1232–1243. Bibcode:1949PhRv...76.1232K. doi:10.1103/physrev.76.1232. ISSN 0031-899X.
- Kaufman, Bruria; Onsager, Lars (1949-10-15). "Crystal Statistics. III. Short-Range Order in a Binary Ising Lattice". Physical Review. 76 (8). American Physical Society (APS): 1244–1252. Bibcode:1949PhRv...76.1244K. doi:10.1103/physrev.76.1244. ISSN 0031-899X.
- "Transition Points", Physical Society Cambridge International Conference on Low Temperatures (1946), with L. Onsager.
- Einstein, A.; Strauss, E. G.; Kaufman, Bruria (1953). The Meaning of Relativity (4th ed.). Princeton University Press. OCLC 1724486. Kaufman's contribution is to an appendix which appeared in later editions, and was revised and published as "Algebraic Properties of the Field in the Relativistic Theory of the Asymmetric Field".
- Einstein, A.; Kaufman, B. (1954). "Algebraic Properties of the Field in the Relativistic Theory of the Asymmetric Field". The Annals of Mathematics. 59 (2). JSTOR: 230–244. doi:10.2307/1969690. ISSN 0003-486X. JSTOR 1969690.
- Einstein, A.; Kaufman, B. (1955). "A New Form of the General Relativistic Field Equations". The Annals of Mathematics. 62 (1). JSTOR: 128–138. doi:10.2307/2007103. ISSN 0003-486X. JSTOR 2007103.
- "Mathematical Structure of the Non-symmetric Field Theory", Proceedings of the Fiftieth Anniversary Conference on Relativity 227–238 (1955).
- Lifson, Shenior; Kaufman, Bruria; Lifson, Hanna (1957). "Neighbor Interactions and Symmetric Properties of Polyelectrolytes". The Journal of Chemical Physics. 27 (6). AIP Publishing: 1356–1362. Bibcode:1957JChPh..27.1356L. doi:10.1063/1.1744007. ISSN 0021-9606.
- Gillis, J.; Kaufman, Bruria (1962). "The Stability of a Rotating Viscous Jet". Quarterly of Applied Mathematics. 19 (4): 301–308. doi:10.1090/qam/136218. JSTOR 43634962.
- Kaufman, Bruria; Lipkin, Harry J (1962). "Momentum transfer to atoms bound in a crystal". Annals of Physics. 18 (2). Elsevier BV: 294–309. Bibcode:1962AnPhy..18..294K. doi:10.1016/0003-4916(62)90072-6. ISSN 0003-4916.
- Kaufman, Bruria; Noack, Cornelius (1965). "Unitary Symmetry of Oscillators and the Talmi Transformation". Journal of Mathematical Physics. 6 (1). AIP Publishing: 142–152. Bibcode:1965JMP.....6..142K. doi:10.1063/1.1704252. ISSN 0022-2488.
- Kaufman, Bruria (1966). "Special Functions of Mathematical Physics from the Viewpoint of Lie Algebra". Journal of Mathematical Physics. 7 (3). AIP Publishing: 447–457. Bibcode:1966JMP.....7..447K. doi:10.1063/1.1704953. ISSN 0022-2488.
