= Naomi Sager =

Computational linguistics expert

- Born: 1927 (age 98–99); Chicago, Illinois, US
- Occupation: Professor of computational linguistics
- Known for: natural language processing for computers
- Children: Eva Harris
- Scientific career
- Thesis: Seriality and ambiguity in English sentence structure (1968)
- Doctoral advisor: Zellig Harris

Naomi Sager (born 1927) is an American computational linguistics research scientist. She is a former research professor at New York University, now retired. She is a pioneer in the development of natural language processing for computers.

== Early life and education ==
Sager was born in Chicago, Illinois in 1927. In 1946 she earned a bachelor of philosophy degree from the University of Chicago. She obtained a Bachelor of Science in electrical engineering from Columbia University in 1953.

== Career ==
After graduating from Columbia, Sager worked for five years as an electronics engineer in the Biophysics Department of the Sloan-Kettering Institute for Cancer Research in New York City. In 1959 she moved to the University of Pennsylvania, where she worked on natural language computer processing. She was part of the team that developed the first English language parsing program, running on the UNIVAC I. Sager developed an algorithm to deal with syntactic ambiguity (where a sentence can be interpreted several ways due to ambiguity in its structure) and to convert sublanguage texts into suitable data formats for retrieval. This was "one of the first major practical applications of sublanguage analysis." This work formed the basis for a PhD thesis, and in 1968 she was awarded a PhD in linguistics from the University of Pennsylvania.

Her work in linguistics led her to New York University, where she collaborated with James Morris and Morris Salkoff to develop a parsing program based on natural language processing. In 1965 NYU launched the Linguistic String Project under Sager's leadership. It was aimed at developing computer methods to access information in the scientific and technical literature, based on linguistic principles. In particular, the team drew on Zellig Harris's discourse analysis methodology to develop a system for computer analysis of natural language. Sager managed the project for 30 years until her retirement in 1995.

At NYU she taught classes in natural language processing and advised doctoral students, many of whom (such as Jerry Hobbs and Carol Friedman) are now leaders in the field of natural language processing.

== Selected publications ==
- Sager, Naomi. Natural Language Information Processing: A Computer Grammar of English and Its Applications Addison-Wesley Publishing Company, Inc. (1981).
- Sager, Naomi. Syntactic analysis of natural language. Advances in computers 8.153–188 (1967): 35.
- Sager, Naomi, et al. Natural Language Processing and the Representation of Clinical Data. Journal of the American Medical Informatics Association 1:142–160 (March–April 1994).
