= Adam Winsler =

American developmental psychologist

- Occupation: Professor of Applied Developmental Psychology

Academic background
- Education: University of New Mexico; Stanford University

Academic work
- Institutions: George Mason University

Adam Winsler is a developmental psychologist known for his research on early child development, private speech, and benefits of arts education. Winsler is Professor of Applied Developmental Psychology at George Mason University.

Winsler co-authored with Laura Berk the volume Scaffolding Children's Learning: Vygotsky and Early Childhood Education, which describes the theories of development created by Lev Vygotsky and how they be applied to children's learning in a school environment. He also co-edited the volume Private Speech, Executive Functioning, and The Development of Verbal Self-Regulation. Winsler was Editor in Chief of Early Childhood Research Quarterly, and serves on their editorial board.

== Biography ==
Winsler received his B.A. degree in psychology at University of New Mexico in 1988. He furthered his education and obtained his Ph.D. in Child and Adolescent Development at Stanford University Graduate School of Education in 1994. While at Stanford, Winsler worked as Program Evaluator and Evaluation Director at the Redwood City Schools in California, where he conducted research on bilingual language development, and documented the benefits of bilingual preschool programs for Spanish-speaking children growing up in low income families.

Winsler started his academic career at the University of Alabama, Tuscaloosa in 1994 as an assistant professor before moving to George Mason University in 1997. His research has been funded by the Institute of Education Sciences of the U.S. Department of Education and by foundations including The Children's Trust and the Early Learning Coalition of Miami-Dade/Monroe.

== Research ==
As a graduate student, Winsler began a collaborative program of research with Rafael M. Diaz on young children's use of private speech, which led to a series of studies on self-regulation in children with attention and behavioral problems. Winsler's research examined private speech in relation to aspects of executive functioning in children with disabilities such as autism spectrum disorder, and ADHD. Following Vygotsky, Winsler considers the use of private speech to be an important turning point in a child's development, as it supports the child in verbalizing their thoughts, regulating their attention, and helping them produce decisions on their own. According to Winsler, private speech is beneficial in lowering impulsivity in small children, while increasing performance as they learn to recollect and express their train of thought.

Winsler is also known for his research on early childhood education, where he has focused on evaluating the cognitive, language, and social-emotional outcomes and school readiness of children from diverse backgrounds, many who come from low-income families, attending variously structured child-care and preschool programs. Winsler and his colleagues' research indicates the importance of the arts in early childhood development. When young children are involved in electives such as dance, drama, and music, they become more socially competent, show better self-regulation, and their academic performance improves.

In work with Martha Carlton, Winsler critiqued the concept of school readiness, which they view as a biased concept based on the perspective of the school system and its qualifications for children's school entry. Winsler has focused on bilingual, immigrant children who are often misunderstood because of their inability to speak English, yet are just as capable as their peers; such children may fall behind due to bias toward languages other than English in the school system. Although immigrant children may lag behind their peers in preschool cognitive and language skills, they show advantages relative to non-immigrant children in socio-emotional skills and behavior.

== Representative Publications ==
- Carlton, M. P., & Winsler, A. (1999). School readiness: The need for a paradigm shift. School Psychology Review, 28, 338–352.
- Lobo, Y. B., & Winsler, A. (2006). The effects of a creative dance and movement program on the social competence of head start preschoolers. Social Development, 15(3), 501–519.
- Morrissey, T. W., Hutchison, L., & Winsler, A. (2014). Family income, school attendance, and academic achievement in elementary school. Developmental Psychology, 50(3), 741–753.
- Winsler, A., Diaz, R. M., & Montero, I. (1997). The role of private speech in the transition from collaborative to independent task performance in young children. Early Childhood Research Quarterly, 12(1), 59–79.
- Winsler, A., Madigan, A. L., & Aquilino, S. A. (2005). Correspondence between maternal and paternal parenting styles in early childhood. Early childhood research quarterly, 20(1), 1–12.
- Winsler, A., & Naglieri, J. (2003). Overt and covert verbal problem-solving strategies: Developmental trends in use, awareness, and relations with task performance in children aged 5 to 17. Child Development, 74(3), 659–678.
- Winsler, A., Tran, H., Hartman, S. C., Madigan, A. L., Manfra, L., & Bleiker, C. (2008). School readiness gains made by ethnically diverse children in poverty attending center-based childcare and public school pre-kindergarten programs. Early Childhood Research Quarterly, 23(3), 314–329.
