= International Association for Korean Language Education =

International professional organization

The International Association for Korean Language Education (IAKLE; Korean: 국제한국어교육학회; Hanja: 國際韓國語敎育學會), founded in 1985, is the world's largest organization of Korean language educators, with over 1,200 members. Its first president was Fred Lukoff of the University of Washington.
