= Fred Lukoff =

American linguist of Korean (1920–2000)

- Born: November 12, 1920
- Died: August 13, 2000 (aged 79); Seattle, Washington, United States
- Occupation: Linguist

Fred Lukoff (Korean: 프레드 루코프; November 12, 1920 – August 13, 2000) was an American linguist who specialized in the study of the Korean language and was the first president of the International Association for Korean Language Education (IAKLE).

A student of Zellig Harris, with whom he wrote "The phonemes of Kingwana-Swahili" in 1942, Lukoff received his bachelor's degree from the University of Pennsylvania in 1947, his master's from the same institution in 1948, and his doctorate, also from Penn, in 1954. After receiving his Ph.D., he joined the MIT Research Laboratory of Electronics the same year as Noam Chomsky to work on machine translation under Victor Yngve, where, in 1956, he wrote a seminal paper on generative phonology, "On accent and juncture in English," with Chomsky and Morris Halle. He taught at Yonsei University in Seoul for the next seven years, and spent the rest of his career at the University of Washington in Seattle until his retirement in 1989.

Lukoff wrote several textbooks for non-native speakers learning Korean, including An Introductory Course in Korean, Spoken Korean, and A First Reader in Korean Writing in Mixed Script.
