= Ablex Publishing =

American publishing company

Ablex Publishing Corporation
- Industry: Publishing
- Headquarters: 655 Ave. of the Americas; New York, NY 10010, USA
- Products: Books; Academic journals

Ablex Publishing Corporation is a privately held publisher of books and academic journals in New York City, New York, USA. It was previously located in Norwood, New Jersey, and also at one time in Westport and Stamford, Connecticut. Ablex publishes edited volumes, monographs, research journals, and textbooks, focused on communication, education, library science, psychology, and technology. In 1997, Ablex became an affiliate company of the JAI Press subsidiary of Elsevier Science, the world's largest publisher of medical and scientific literature. Ablex merged as an imprint of Greenwood Publishing Group in or after 2000; Greenwood itself was also part of Reed Elsevier since 1993, further merged with Houghton Mifflin Harcourt in 2007, then sold with all imprints to ABC-Clio in 2008 (now a subsidiary of Bloomsbury Publishing).

== Partial list of titles and imprints ==
- Ablex Communication, Culture & Information Series
- Ablex series in computational science
- Ablex series in software engineering
- Ablex series in artificial intelligence, Jerry Hobbs, editor
- Ablex Theoretical Issues in Cognitive Science
- Advances in Human-Computer Interaction
- Cognitive development
- Cognitive science: journal of the Cognitive Science Society
- Early Childhood Research Quarterly
- International Journal of Bilingualism
- Linguistics and education: an international research journal
- National Women's Studies Association Journal
- New directions in computers and composition studies
- The David C. Anchin series in social and policy issues in education
