= Langages =

- Discipline: Language, literature, humanities
- Language: French

Publication details
- History: 1966–present
- Publisher: Armand Colin (France)
- Frequency: Quarterly

Standard abbreviations
- ISO 4: Langages

Indexing
- ISSN: 0458-726X (print); 1958-9549 (web)
- JSTOR: 0458726X

Langages : Revue internationale des sciences du langage is a peer-reviewed academic journal of linguistics published by Armand Colin.

Founded in 1966 by R. Barthes, J. Dubois, A.-J. Greimas, B. Pottier, B. Quemada and N. Ruwet, the journal Langages makes available to a multidisciplinary scientific community, without theoretical or methodological exclusivity, the results of contemporary research carried out in psycholinguistics, automatic language processing, didactics, translation, etc.
