= Coercion (linguistics) =

Linguistic reinterpretation

In linguistics, coercion is a term applied to a process of reinterpretation triggered by a mismatch between the semantic properties of a selector and the semantic properties of the selected element. As Catalina Ramírez explains it, this phenomenon is called coercion because the process forces meaning into a lexical phrase where there is otherwise a discrepancy of the semantic aspects of the phrase. The term was first used in the semantic literature in 1988 by Marc Moens and Mark Steedman, who adopted it due to its "loose analogy with type-coercion in programming languages.” In his written framework of the generative lexicon (a formal compositional approach to lexical semantics), Pustejovsky (1995:111) defines coercion as "a semantic operation that converts an argument to the type which is expected by a function, where it would otherwise result in a type error."

Coercion in the Pustejovsky framework refers to both complement coercion and aspectual coercion. Complement coercion involves a mismatch of semantic meaning between lexical items, while aspectual coercion involves a mismatch of temporality between lexical items.

A commonly used example of complement coercion is the sentence "I began the book.” The phrase "I began" is assumed to be a selector which requires the following complement to denote an event, but "the book" denotes a noun phrase, not an event. So, as a result of coercion, "I began" forces “the book" from a simple noun phrase to an event involving that noun, causing the sentence to be interpreted to mean (most likely) "I began to read the book" or "I began to write the book."

An example of aspectual coercion involving temporal connectives is "Let's leave after dessert" (Pustejovsky 1995:230). Another example of aspectual coercion from psycholinguistics research is the sentence "The tiger jumped for an hour," where the prepositional phrase "for an hour" coerces the lexical meaning of "jumped" to be iterative across the entire duration, instead of having occurred only once.

Coercion is a well-discussed topic in the field of linguistics, especially in semantics and construction grammar. It is also explored in cognitive linguistics. An example is Yao-Ying Lai’s 2017 study on the effects of coercion on mental processing; results showed that phrases involving aspectual words (such as “start”) required longer reading times to understand than did phrases with psychological words (such as “enjoy” and “love”). Currently, there is debate surrounding the proper approach to coercion in linguistics, including systemic coercion versus language-user coercion and a semantic perspective versus pragmatic perspective, among others.
