= Transformational syntax =

In linguistics, transformational syntax is a derivational approach to syntax that developed from the extended standard theory of generative grammar originally proposed by Noam Chomsky in his books Syntactic Structures and Aspects of the Theory of Syntax. It emerged from a need to improve on approaches to grammar in structural linguistics.

Particularly in early incarnations, transformational syntax adopted the view that phrase structure grammar must be enriched by a transformational grammar, with syntactic rules or syntactic operations that alter the base structures created by phrase structure rules. In more recent theories, including Government and Binding Theory but especially in Minimalism, the strong distinction between phrase structure and transformational components has largely been abandoned, with operations that build structure (phrase structure rules) and those that change structure (transformational rules) either interleaved, or unified under a single operation (as in the Minimalist operation Merge).

== Overview ==
According to the Chomskyan tradition, language acquisition is easy for children because they are born with a universal grammar in their minds. The tradition also distinguishes between linguistic competence, what a person knows of a language, and linguistic performance, how a person uses it. Finally, grammars and metagrammars are ranked by three levels of adequacy: observational, descriptive, and explanatory. A core aspect of the original Standard Theory is a distinction between two different representations of a sentence, called deep structure and surface structure. The two representations are linked to each other by a set of transformation rules, the totality of these rules is what constitutes grammar, and what a grammatical description of a language should present. Under this theory, a speaker must have access to both structures to interpret an expression.

Under this model, syntax was placed in the center of linguistic research and sought to go beyond description. Scholars explored the formalism of syntax and the psychology of grammar under this model. This led to more systematic research on linguistic data such as native speaker judgments and distinctions in grammaticality.

Many notable linguists have written on the topic, including Andrew Radford, Rodney Huddleston, and Roger Fowler. Aspects of transformational syntax were revised or replaced under the Minimalist program.

=== Non-transformational syntax ===
Non-transformational syntax describes competing models. The main non-transformational syntactic frameworks include head-driven phrase structure grammar, lexical-functional grammar, categorial grammar, and simpler syntax.
