= Sister Bernadette's Barking Dog =

2006 book

Sister Bernadette's Barking Dog: The Quirky History and Lost Art of Diagramming Sentences
- First edition
- Author: Kitty Burns Florey
- Language: English
- Genre: Non-fiction
- Publication date: 2006

Sister Bernadette's Barking Dog: The Quirky History and Lost Art of Diagramming Sentences is a 2006 book by author Kitty Burns Florey about the history and art of sentence diagramming. Florey learned to diagram sentences as a Catholic school student at St. John the Baptist Academy in Syracuse, New York. Sentence diagramming was introduced by Brainerd Kellogg and Alonzo Reid, professors at the Brooklyn Polytechnic Institute, in their book History of English published in 1877.

== Reception ==
Writing for The Wall Street Journal, Charles Harrington Elster calls the book a "pleasantly discursive and affectionate tribute to an antiquated art" in which Florey explains the concept and history of sentence diagramming with sentences by Lewis Carroll, Woody Allen, Henry James, Marcel Proust, Mark Twain, and William Faulkner. Publishers Weekly says Sister Bernadette's Barking Dog is "part memoir, part literary gossip, but mostly a guide to the lost art of sentence diagramming" which "hilariously ... answers such questions as, Why did Gertrude Stein hate commas? Was Mark Twain or James Fenimore Cooper the better grammarian? And why ... is George W. Bush such a lousy speaker?"
