= Acceptability judgment task =

Linguistics research method

An acceptability judgment task, also called acceptability rating task, is a common method in empirical linguistics to gather information about the internal grammar of speakers of a language.

== Acceptability and grammaticality ==
The goal of acceptability rating studies is to gather insights into the mental grammars of participants. As the grammaticality of a linguistic construction is an abstract construct that cannot be accessed directly, this type of tasks is usually not called grammaticality, but acceptability judgment. This can be compared to intelligence. Intelligence is an abstract construct that cannot be measured directly. What can be measured are the outcomes of specific test items. The result of one item, however, is not very telling. Instead, IQ tests consist of several items building a score.

Similarly, in acceptability rating studies, grammatical constructions are measured through several items (sentences) to be rated. That is done also to ensure that participants do not rate the meaning of a particular sentence.

The difference between acceptability and grammaticality is linked to the distinction between performance and competence in generative grammar.

== Types ==
Several different types of acceptability rating tasks are used in linguistics. The most common tasks use Likert scales. Forced choice and yes-no rating tasks are also common. Besides more popular test types, there are other methods like thermometer judgments or magnitude estimation (ME); however, it has been argued that ME studies have unproductive variation in their results.

== See also ==
- Quantitative linguistics
