= Neurolinguistic approach =

Pedagogical method

The neurolinguistic approach is a pedagogical method used in acquiring/teaching second or foreign languages (abridged as L2/FL) in a school setting, singling out the ability to communicate, both orally and in writing. Originally, it was developed for the teaching of French, but there are now a variety of programs based on this approach for the teaching of several different languages. The most widely used program in Canada is that known as "Intensive French" (IF).

== Context ==
The NLA was developed in Canada by Claude Germain, of the Département de didactique des langues at the Université du Québec à Montréal, and Joan Netten, of the Faculty of Education at Memorial University of Newfoundland, in the context of the growing influence of emerging educational neurosciences. It draws principally from the research carried out by Michel Paradis (1994, 2004, 2009) of McGill University and by the Institut des sciences cognitives, Université du Québec à Montréal (UQAM), as well as by research conducted by Nick C. Ellis (Centre for Complex systems, University of Michigan). It is also influenced by Vygotsky’s concepts of social interaction (1997).

The NLA is characterised by the need to ensure the independent development, in a classroom setting, of both components of any effective communication: an implicit competence, or the ability to spontaneously use a L2/FL orally, and explicit knowledge, or the awareness of the way a language functions, its grammatical rules and its vocabulary. This dimension of the NLA is based on Paradis (1994, 2004) and Nick C. Ellis (2011). Paradis’s research makes a clear distinction between explicit knowledge, which is the conscious knowledge surrounding a L2/FL and which is learnt through noticing and explanations, and implicit competence, which can only be acquired non-consciously by using the language in authentic communicative situations.

In NLA, implicit competence is referred to as internal grammar. This internal grammar is formed of a network of neuronal connections formed in the brain by the frequent use of the same pathways or circuits; these are NOT rules, but a linguistic structure’s frequent statistical patterns (Paradis, 2004; Ellis, 2011). Furthermore, explicit knowledge is referred to in the NLA as external grammar. Paradis’s research shows that explicit knowledge (external grammar) is sustained by the declarative memory, while implicit competence (internal grammar), which is a skill, is sustained by the procedural memory (Germain et Netten, 2013a). According to Paradis, there is no direct connection between these two components. While external grammar is taught relatively effectively in the classroom, the same cannot be said of internal grammar. This is why conventional L2/FL teaching programs, generally based on current methods or approaches, cannot lead most students to acquire spontaneous communication in the language being taught. This is true even of programs which claim to use a communicative approach but which, despite its creators’ theoretical bases, first teach explicit knowledge (grammar rules or knowledge generally founded on written language) before the acquisition of implicit competence, which belongs to oral language (Germain et Netten, 2005, 2013b, Germain, 2017).

Paradis’s views have been challenged in some quarters; however, the co-conceptors of the NLA find them to be the most accurate/satisfactory descriptors of the SL acquisition/learning process.

== Fundamental principles ==
The NLA is based on five fundamental principles developed by Germain and Netten (2011, 2012a; Netten and Germain, 2012) to create the necessary classroom conditions for students to first learn spontaneous oral communication in their L2/FL, before moving on to explicit knowledge of the language in reading and writing activities (Germain et Netten 2013b; Germain, 2017).

=== Acquisition of internal grammar (implicit competence) ===
In order to create a classroom atmosphere where a limited number of linguistic structures are used and reused often enough to ensure that patterns, or neuronal connections, are developed in the students’ procedural memory, each teaching unit introduces three or four communicative functions which are related both to each other and to the unit’s theme. Each function is presented and used individually in several different situations allowing for brief personal conversations between the students. At the end of the unit, the functions are combined to permit more complex discussions on the subject. Thus, oral language is learnt in a conversational context. The importance of the context in permitting an effective transfer to other situations has been confirmed in Segalowitz’s recent work in cognitive neuroscience, in particular his concept of Transfer Appropriate Processing (TAP) (Segalowitz, 2010).

=== Recourse to a literacy-based perspective in teaching a L2/FL ===
Literacy is usually understood as the ability to use a language to interpret and understand the environment. A literacy-based perspective allows the teacher to consider the acquisition of a language as the development of skills rather than of knowledge. This also means prioritising the development of oral skills, a view confirmed by recent research in neurodidactic science (Huc and Smith, 2008) which calls for the development of verbal communication before reading and writing. Texts used during the reading portion of the class, as well as the topics for written work, are based on the same theme and involve using the same structures first developed verbally. Reading and writing are taught directly in the L2/FL without recourse to translation. The strategies used are similar to those used for developing literacy when teaching the students their first language, but must be modified. For instance, a greater emphasis may be placed on oral preparation before reading and writing, which is essential when developing literacy in a L2/FL, given that the students’ internal grammar is considerably more limited than that of those who are learning to read and write in their first language (Germain et Netten, 2005, 2012, 2013b, Germain, 2017). A literacy-based approach also allows for external grammar to be brought into play after the language has been used orally and in context (observing grammatical details in the reading text and using these observed cases when writing paragraphs).

=== Recourse to a project-based approach ===
In order for students to acquire an internal grammar, the focus must be on the message rather than on the language, as internal grammar can only be acquired unconsciously that is, without consciously paying attention to the language’s features (Paradis, 1994, 2004, 2009). To facilitate the creation of significant situations and interesting, cognitively challenging tasks for the students, the content of the teaching units is organised sequentially, going from a few mini projects to a final project. The suggested activities are therefore not isolated and require the students’ active participation, which calls on other cerebral mechanisms that are essential to successfully acquiring a language (Paradis, 2004). This type of organisation also allows each unit’s language structures to be used and reused, while allowing the teacher to help students to learn by gradually increasing the difficulty of both tasks and language structures.

=== Use of authentic communicative situations ===
The ability to communicate spontaneously develops only through authentic communication. It cannot be learnt through controlled exercises or by memorising dialogues (R. Ellis, 1997) where the language thus learned is focused, foremost, on linguistic forms and is stored in the declarative memory. This type of activity does not permit the student to use the same structures sufficiently often to develop the patterns required to create implicit competence, or internal grammar, unconsciously. Moreover, only authentic communication calls on other cerebral mechanisms that are necessary for acquisition to happen, such as those linked to motivation (Paradis, 2004). In the NLA, all classroom communication is authentic: the teacher does not ask unrealistic questions and the students’ answers are always personal. Communication always takes place in the L2/FL.

=== Use of interactive teaching strategies ===
Interaction between students in the L2/FL is an essential ingredient for developing internal grammar and the ability to communicate spontaneously. To facilitate such interactions, the NLA applies five steps to teaching oral communication, throughout the teaching units, as well as encouraging activities carried out in pairs or in small-groups. On the linguistic level, the way is prepared for students to use the structures they require to accomplish the assigned tasks, but the interactions are authentic in that the students express their own thoughts. There are also three other specific teaching strategies recommended in using the NLA: fluency, accuracy, and purposeful listening. The students must reply in complete sentences when learning new language structures, in order to facilitate the building of their internal grammar and the ease with which they use the L2/FL. For internal grammar, accuracy is achieved by consistent and instant oral correction of errors and having the student reuse the correct structure orally. Essentially, in developing internal grammar, oral correction of errors replaces the teaching of grammar rules. Purposeful listening, meanwhile, replaces the usual oral comprehension exercises; it is a matter of encouraging learners to constantly listen to what the teacher and the other learners say" (Germain, 2017, p. 89). The NLA uses eight strategies for learning/teaching both reading and writing.

Currently (2018), there are several implementations of the NLA, notably the Intensive French (IF) program in Canada and a French language training program at a Chinese university. The Canadian IF, which is geared to 5th and 6th grade students (11/12 years old) and continues to the end of high school, was launched in the Canadian province of Newfoundland and Labrador in 1998. Since then, it has spread to almost all Canadian provinces and territories (the French-majority province of Québec has an intensive English program which, as it is not based on NLA principles, is similar but not identical to IF). Over 70,000 students have participated in the first year of the IF program in Canada since its inception. In China, the program is aimed at young adults (median age of 19) and was launched at the South China Normal University (Guangzhou) in 2010. It has attracted much interest from other Chinese institutions (including a high school) as well as in Japan (Gal Bailly, 2011; Ricordel, 2012), Taiwan, Iran, Belgium and France (Germain, 2017).

These programs were developed under the direction of the NLA’s co-developers. At this time, other implementations of the NLA are being developed in Canada by other professionals in order to teach certain First Nations languages in Yukon and the Northwest Territories, as well as in Saskatchewan, Prince Edward Island, the James Bay region of Québec for the teaching of English, French and Cree, and the teaching of Mohawk, French and English to the Mohawk Nation which extends through the southern part of Ontario and Quebec and northern New York state. Programs in Spanish and Mandarin are also implemented in the Calgary Public School Board. Any curricular resource that conforms to NLA principles can be adapted to teach communication skills in any L2/FL, as suggested by a recent trial of teaching/learning Spanish among francophone Quebeckers in a university setting (specifically, at UQÀM, the Université du Québec à Montréal).
