= Syntax tree =

Syntax tree may refer to:

- Abstract syntax tree, used in computer science
- Concrete syntax tree, used in linguistics
