= Informant (linguistics) =

Person referenced for a language study

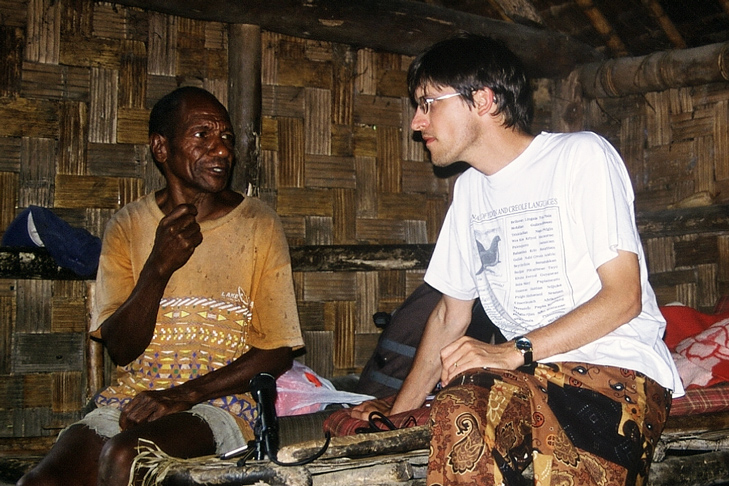
Alexandre François with an Olrat-speaking informant in 2003

An informant or consultant in linguistics is a native speaker or member of a community who acts as a linguistic reference for a language or speech community being studied. The informant's role is that of a senior interpreter, who demonstrates native pronunciation, provides grammaticality judgments regarding linguistic well-formedness, and may also explain cultural references and other important contextual information to researchers from other cultures studying the language. Linguistic informants, especially those who frequently work with linguists, may play a greater than usual role in the researcher's work, and other titles such as consultant or coauthor may be used to acknowledge and accurately reflect that contribution.

== Ethics concerns ==
In any research situation, there is "an unequal relationship between investigator and informants" – if that inequality already existed before the research, it tends to amplify it. (This power differential is generally true despite clear examples of shifting power dynamics between researcher and informant, which are important to also consider.) This inequality has led to questions of ethics and the responsibility of linguists and other researchers to the populations that they study. Standard contributions to this discussion stressed the importance of not engaging in unethical behaviors, such as "coercing subjects to participate or neglecting to get informed consent from them; exploiting or abusing them in the course of research; violating their privacy or breaching confidentiality." These standard requirements were framed in the idea of "do no harm." However, these considerations are now being increasingly viewed as inadequate, since researchers "often feel a more positive desire to help [their informants]." This advocacy can take many forms, but is characterized by its impulse to somehow give back to the community that the researcher is studying. This can be taken a step further when linguists give the communities access to their findings or data, so that the communities can use it to advocate for themselves, which is characterized as "empowerment" research (in contrast to "ethical" or "advocacy" research). It can also be valuable to use "'feedback' techniques," wherein the researcher maintains communication with the informants throughout the process to ensure that they consent to the ways they are being represented in the final presentation of results. Ben Rampton used "feedback" techniques in his study of Asian schoolboys, and Norma Mendoza-Denton also did in her work with Californian cholas' views on makeup. These questions of advocacy also have larger implications, namely in a critique of the positivist methods generally used for research in the social sciences.
