= Reed–Kellogg sentence diagram =

Pictorial representation of the grammatical structure of a sentence

A sentence diagram is a pictorial representation of the grammatical structure of a sentence, and the Reed–Kellogg system is the traditional, definitive system for making those diagrams. Because sentence diagrams show the relation between the words of a sentence and its structure, they can be useful when teaching and learning written languages.

== Reed-Kellogg system ==
In the Reed–Kellogg system, sentences are diagrammed as follows:

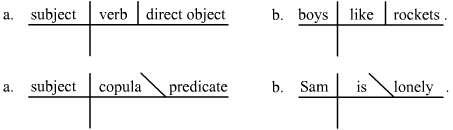

The diagram of a simple sentence begins with a horizontal line called the base. The subject is written on the left, the copula or predicate on the right, separated by a vertical bar that extends through the base. The predicate must contain a verb, and the verb either requires other sentence elements to complete the predicate, permits them to do so, or precludes them from doing so. The verb and its object, when present, are separated by a line that ends at the baseline. If the object is a direct object, the line is vertical. If the object is a predicate noun or adjective, the line looks like a backslash, \, sloping toward the subject.

Modifiers of the subject, predicate, or object are placed below the baseline:

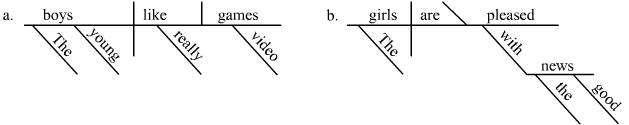

Modifiers, such as adjectives (including articles) and adverbs, are placed on slanted lines below the word they modify. Prepositional phrases are also placed beneath the word they modify; the preposition goes on a slanted line and the slanted line leads to a horizontal line on which the object of the preposition is placed.

These basic diagramming conventions are augmented for other types of sentence structures, e.g. for coordination and subordinate clauses.

== History ==
An early attempt at creating "a complete system of diagrams" for syntax analysis was made by grammarian S. W. Clark in his 1860 volume A Practical Grammar: in which Words, Phrases, and Sentences Are Classified According to their Offices and Their Various Relations to One Another. The system, which involves linking together "balloons" of words, failed to catch on.

Educators Alonzo Reed and Brainerd Kellogg would soon create what was to become the definitive system for traditional sentence diagramming in their 1877 work Higher Lessons in English. This "Reed–Kellogg system" was developed to teach grammar to students through clear visualization. It lost some support in the 1970s in the US, and it is not widely used in Europe. It is considered "traditional" in comparison to the parse trees of academic linguists.

== Constituency and dependency ==
Reed–Kellogg diagrams reflect, to some degree, concepts underlying modern parse trees. Those concepts are the constituency relation of phrase structure grammars and the dependency relation of dependency grammars. These two relations are illustrated here adjacent to each other for comparison, where D means Determiner, N means Noun, NP means Noun Phrase, S means Sentence, V means Verb, VP means Verb Phrase and IP means Inflectional Phrase.

X-bar theory graph of the sentence "He studies linguistics at the university."

Constituency is a one-to-one-or-more relation; every word in the sentence corresponds to one or more nodes in the tree diagram. Dependency, in contrast, is a one-to-one relation; every word in the sentence corresponds to exactly one node in the tree diagram. Both parse trees employ the convention where the category acronyms (e.g. N, NP, V, VP) are used as the labels on the nodes in the tree. The one-to-one-or-more constituency relation is capable of increasing the amount of sentence structure to the upper limits of what is possible. The result can be very "tall" trees, such as those associated with X-bar theory. Both constituency-based and dependency-based theories of grammar have established traditions.

Reed–Kellogg diagrams employ both of these modern tree generating relations. The constituency relation is present in the Reed–Kellogg diagrams insofar as subject, verb, object, and/or predicate are placed equi-level on the horizontal base line of the sentence and divided by a vertical or slanted line. In a Reed–Kellogg diagram, the vertical dividing line that crosses the base line corresponds to the binary division in the constituency-based tree (S → NP + VP), and the second vertical dividing line that does not cross the baseline (between verb and object) corresponds to the binary division of VP into verb and direct object (VP → V + NP). Thus the vertical and slanting lines that cross or rest on the baseline correspond to the constituency relation. The dependency relation, in contrast, is present insofar as modifiers dangle off of or appear below the words that they modify.

== Functional breakdown ==
A sentence may also be broken down by functional parts: subject, object, adverbial, verb (predicator). The subject is the owner of an action, the verb represents the action, the object represents the recipient of the action, and the adverbial qualifies the action. The various parts can be phrases rather than individual words.

== See also ==
- Parse tree
- Unparser
