= Kitty Burns Florey =

American writer

- Born: Syracuse, NY
- Occupations: Novelist, short story writer, essayist, copy editor
- Writing career
- Period: 1979 - present

Kitty Burns Florey is the author of eleven novels and four nonfiction books. She lives in Amherst, Massachusetts.

== Bibliography ==
- The Music of Eighty: Learning in Old Age (2025), White River Press
- Amity Street (2017), White River Press
- The Quest for Inez: Two Ways to Find a Grandmother (2015), Genealogy House
- The Writing Master (2011), White River Press
- Script and Scribble: The Rise and Fall of Handwriting (2009), Melville House Publishing
- The Sleep Specialist (2007), Raven's Eye Publishing
- Sister Bernadette's Barking Dog (2006), Melville House Publishing
- Solos (2004), Berkley Books
- Souvenir of Cold Springs (2001), Counterpoint Press, Berkley Books
- Five Questions (2001), Time Warner Books
- Vigil for a Stranger (1994)
- Duet (1998)
- Real Life (1986)
- The Garden Path (1983)
- Chez Cordelia (1980)
- Family Matters (1979)
