= Heavy NP shift =

Heavy NP shift is an operation that involves re-ordering (shifting) a "heavy" noun phrase (NP) to a position to the right of its canonical position under certain circumstances. The heaviness of the NP is determined by its grammatical complexity; whether or not shifting occurs can impact the grammaticality of the sentence.

Ross (1967) is thought to have been the first to systematically investigate the properties of heavy NP shift. Although the term heavy NP shift derives from the theoretical framework of transformational grammar, which describes the process in terms of movement of the NP, linguists working in other frameworks also use this term. And in approaches to syntax where NP is analyzed as a determiner phrase (DP), heavy NP shift is called heavy DP shift.

== Factors contributing to the heaviness of an NP ==
Early observations of weight or heaviness have been credited to a rhythmical feel that unconsciously takes shape in languages, that is, the tendency of growth, to go from shorter to longer elements within a phrase. In these early observations, it was noted that when there are two constituents differing in size, the smaller constituent usually precedes the longer one. This observation has been more recently coined as the "principle of end-weight". The literature proposes many different definitions of weight or heaviness such as number of words in the NP (length of NP), number of nodes in the NP, and more generally number of phrasal nodes. Other observations on heaviness include:

=== Complexity of NP ===
- A NP's internal syntactic structure makes it 'complex'. A complex or heavy NP is one with a noun head and a modifying clause.

ex: NP[my rich uncle from Detroit] is complex as its noun head my and a modifying clause rich uncle from Detroit. The internal structure is complex enough to be shifted to the right of its canonical position.
NP[N'[N my][NP[NP[AP rich][[NP uncle]][PP[P from][NP Detroit]]]]]

=== Separability of NP ===
- According to Chomsky (1975), the separability of the indirect object is determined by the complexity of the direct object (NP). It is not length in words but rather the complexity of the object that determines the "naturalness of formation".

ex: "They brought all the leaders of the riot in" appears more natural than "They brought the man I saw in." According to Chomsky (1975), the constituent [the man I saw], although shorter than the constituent [all the leaders of the riot], is more complex.

=== Relative weight of NP ===
- The relative weight of post verbal constituents influences their order, not the weight of any one constituent such as NP. One study found that independent of NP length and complexity, the NP did not shift unless it was at least 4 words longer than the surrounding material.

ex: The canonical phrase, I gave NP[the valuable book that was extremely difficult to find] PP[to Mary], is more likely to shift the heavy NP to the end of the phrase since the NP is more than 4 words longer than the following prepositional phrase (PP).

=== Early versus late attachment of NP ===
- A theory of Early Immediate Constituents (EIC) seeks to explain word order variation at a phrase level of grammaticalization or more simply, a "save the hardest for last" approach. Constituents are syntactically grouped so they can be recognized and produced rapidly and efficiently as possible. The parser must analyze the VP and its immediate constituents then calculate how early the listener will be able to identify all the constituents by counting the number of words it takes until all immediate constituents (IC's) are recognizable.

ex: According to EIC, the phrase, [I gave_{1} to_{2} Mary_{3} the_{4} valuable book that was extremely difficult to find] is easy to remember because this phrase only requires 4 words (indicated by subscript numbers) to find all IC's. Compare this to, [I gave_{1} the_{2} valuable_{3} book_{4} that_{5} was_{6} extremely_{7} difficult_{8} to_{9} find_{10} to_{11} Mary], which requires 11 words to find all IC's. According to the EIC, the first example is preferred because it is easier to comprehend.

The EIC theory also proposes that word and constituent order varies cross linguistically and is dependent on whether a language is head final (such as Japanese and Korean) or head initial (such as English).

=== New information precedes old information ===
- Pragmatic effects have been thought to influence heavy NP shift. According to this theory, items are sequenced so unpredictable content (new or important information) precedes predictable content (old or unimportant information).

== Heavy NP shift in different languages ==
=== Heavy NP shift in English ===
Examples 1a, 2a, and 3a all show canonical order whereas 1b, 2b, 3b show the NP shifted to the right of its canonical position:

1. a) I gave the book that I bought last week to Mary.
1. b) I gave to Mary the book that I bought last week.

2. a) I met my rich uncle from Detroit on the street.
2. b) I met on the street my rich uncle from Detroit.

3. a) I sent the recipes from the paper that I was talking about to you.
3. b) I sent to you the recipes from the paper that I was talking about.

If a constituent is not considered 'heavy' or 'complex', the shift would not make grammatical sense or would be considered awkward to a native speaker of English, e.g.

4. a) I sent it to you.
4. b) *I sent to you it.

In example 4, the verb sent has a personal pronoun as its direct object. Typically, nothing can intervene between a verb and its direct object in most dialects of English, e.g.

5. a) I consider the problem unsolvable.
5. b) *I consider unsolvable the problem.

In example 5b, the NP the problem is not complex enough to be shifted.

=== Heavy NP shift in Japanese ===
Japanese is an SOV (subject, object, verb) language. Particles in Japanese encode syntactic functions, marking the relationship of the subject and object (NP) to the verb. This allows Japanese speakers to 'scramble' the order of particle-marked phrases which is important when considering word ordering biases such as heavy NP shift. In corpus studies and experiments, it has been shown that Japanese-speakers have a long-before-short bias, contrasting English biases of short-before-long in the presence of a heavy NP.

In an experiment, participants had to create a sentence from a set of phrases that varied in length of the direct object (DO) and indirect object (IO) for dative verbs. In Japanese, the order for dative verbs is; subject (S) -indirect object (IO) -direct object (DO). For example, the 'short' phrase:

Masako wa(S) otoko ni(IO) keeki o(DO) haitatusita(V), translates to, Masako delivered the cake to the man.

In this study, participants chose this order for a short phrase the majority of the time, without rearranging the order of the IO and DO. However, when the DO and IO were lengthened, the participants were more likely to shift the longer phrase before the short phrase even if it switched the order from S-IO-DO to S-DO-IO. For example, the phrase:

Masako wa(S) otoko ni(IO) sinbun de syookaisareta keeki o(DO) haitatusita(V).

was shifted so that the long DO was before the short IO:

Masako wa(S) sinbun de syookaisareta keeki o(DO) otoko ni(IO) haitatusita(V).

If the IO was longer than the DO, the participants were less likely to switch the order, leaving it as S-IO-DO. This suggests that Japanese speakers have a bias towards placing longer phrases before shorter ones.

=== Heavy NP shift in German ===
German word order is variable and flexible and relies on a rich inflectional system. Rearrangements of an NP and PP can take place similar to English i.e. [NP PP V] or [PP NP V]. German does not allow a direct object NP to the right of a final verb. The examples below show the rearrangement of a heavy NP and a PP. Either order is acceptable in German as word order variation is not as strict as it is in other languages such as English.

Ich habe [NP meinen reichen Onkel aus Berlin] [PP auf der Straße] [V getroffen].
I have {} my rich uncle from Berlin {} on the street {} met
'I met [NP my rich uncle from Berlin] [PP on the street].'

Ich habe [PP auf der Straße] [NP meinen reichen Onkel aus Berlin] [V getroffen].
I have {} on the street {} my rich uncle from Berlin {} met
'I met [PP on the street] [NP my rich uncle from Berlin].'

== Analyses of heavy NP shift ==
=== Movement analyses of heavy NP shift ===
For analyses that treat heavy NP shift as movement, there are two kinds of shifts when considering heavy NPs: one involves rightward movement, the involves leftward movement.

==== Heavy NP shift as rightward movement ====
The first, and most traditional, is when a "heavy" object NP is shifted rightward to the end of the utterance. According to one theory a complex NP will be shifted rightward if it does not cross over a verb. Another theory proposes a leftward movement of a "light" indirect object. According to this theory an indirect object is moved leftward independently of verb movement to a higher specifier position, next to the verb and before the direct object, leaving the heavy NP in situ.

This syntax tree shows an example of rightward movement of a heavy NP. The entire constituent my rich uncle from Detroit has 'shifted' from its position as a complement to the verb to an adjunct of the VP. This tree has been created using a particular style of syntax, mainly X-bar Theory.

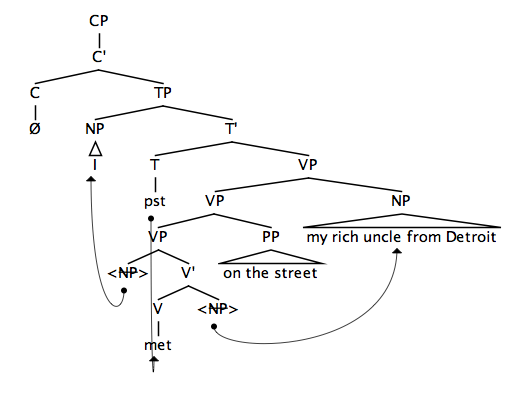

==== Heavy NP shift as leftward movement ====
The syntax tree below shows an example of leftward movement of a 'light' indirect object. The constituent on the street has 'shifted' from its position in a small clause environment past the direct object to a higher functional specifier position leaving the 'heavy NP' in situ. This syntax tree has been created using a particular style of syntax, mainly X-bar Theory.

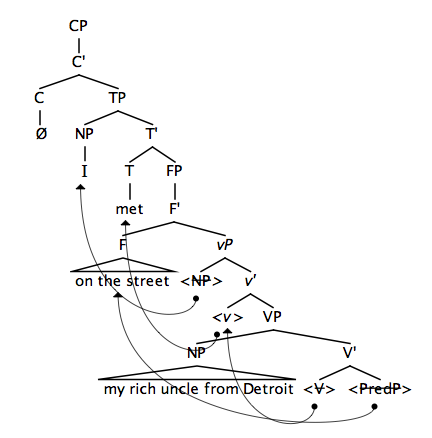

=== Processing analyses of heavy NP shift ===
Psycholinguists want to understand when speakers resort to shifting heavy NPs to the end of a phrase. A study of printed corpus material found that different verbs exhibit different word order variation. The study focused on whether speakers and writers produce the word of heavy NP shift for their own benefit, or if they take into account the needs of the listener or reader. In this study, two verb classes were compared to test the choice of early and late commitment (points when the speaker has 'committed' themselves to producing a VP immediately followed by NP and PP constituents). The study examined transitive verbs, which require an NP object (e.g. bring, carry, make, put, etc.) and prepositional or intransitive verbs that do not require an NP object (e.g. add, build, call, draw, leave, etc.).

Example of utterance with transitive verb:

Pat brought a box with a ribbon around it →to the party.

Pat brought →to the party a box with a ribbon around it.

Example of utterance with intransitive verb:

Pat wrote something about Chris→ on the blackboard.

Pat wrote on the blackboard →something about Chris.

The arrows indicate where the speaker commits to producing a VP with an NP and PP following. They also indicate where the listener is sure the VP will contain a NP and PP.

After analyzing written and spoken corpus data it was found that heavy NP shift is more common with in transitive verbs. This suggests using heavy NP shift word order with intransitive verbs allows the producer more time to decide whether they will include a direct object or not. This reduces the amount of planning needed and gives the speaker more time to articulate their thoughts. Having this extra time should in turn reduce the chance of the producer having to correct or abort an utterance.
