= Transformational grammar =

Earliest model of generative grammar

In linguistics, transformational grammar (TG) or transformational-generative grammar (TGG) was the earliest model of grammar proposed within the research tradition of generative grammar. Like current generative theories, it treated grammar as a system of formal rules that generate all and only grammatical sentences of a given language. What was distinctive about transformational grammar was that it posited transformation rules that mapped a sentence's deep structure to its pronounced form. For example, in many variants of transformational grammar, the English active voice sentence "Emma saw Daisy" and its passive counterpart "Daisy was seen by Emma" share a common deep structure generated by phrase structure rules, differing only in that the latter's structure is modified by a passivization transformation rule.

== Basic mechanisms ==
Transformational grammar was a species of generative grammar and shared many of its goals and postulations, including the notion of linguistics as a cognitive science, the need for formal explicitness, and the competence-performance distinction. Transformational grammar included two kinds of rules: phrase-structure rules and transformational rules.

=== Deep structure and surface structure ===
In transformational grammar, each sentence in a language has two levels of representation: a deep structure and a surface structure. The deep structure represents a sentence's core semantic relations and is mapped onto the surface structure, which follows the sentence's phonological system very closely, via transformations.

Deep structures are generated by phrase structure grammars using rewrite rules.

=== Transformations ===
Transformations are rules that map a deep structure to a surface structure. For example, a typical transformation in TG is subject-auxiliary inversion (SAI). That rule takes as its input a declarative sentence with an auxiliary, such as "John has eaten all the heirloom tomatoes", and transforms it into "Has John eaten all the heirloom tomatoes?" In the original formulation (Chomsky 1957), those rules held over strings of terminals, constituent symbols or both.

X NP AUX Y $\Rightarrow$ X AUX NP Y

(NP = Noun Phrase and AUX = Auxiliary)

In the 1970s, by the time of the Extended Standard Theory, following Joseph Emonds's work on structure preservation, transformations came to be viewed as holding over trees. By the end of government and binding theory, in the late 1980s, transformations were no longer structure-changing operations at all; instead, they added information to already existing trees by copying constituents.

The earliest conceptions of transformations were that they were construction-specific devices. For example, there was a transformation that turned active sentences into passive ones. A different transformation raised embedded subjects into main clause subject position in sentences such as "John seems to have gone", and a third reordered arguments in the dative alternation. With the shift from rules to principles and constraints in the 1970s, those construction-specific transformations morphed into general rules (all the examples just mentioned are instances of NP movement), which eventually changed into the single general rule move alpha or Move.

Transformations actually come in two types: the post-deep structure kind mentioned above, which are string- or structure-changing, and generalized transformations (GTs). GTs were originally proposed in the earliest forms of generative grammar (such as in Chomsky 1957). They take small structures, either atomic or generated by other rules, and combine them. For example, the generalized transformation of embedding would take the kernel "Dave said X" and the kernel "Dan likes smoking" and combine them into "Dave said Dan likes smoking." GTs are thus structure-building rather than structure-changing. In the Extended Standard Theory and government and binding theory, GTs were abandoned in favor of recursive phrase structure rules, but they are still present in tree-adjoining grammar as the Substitution and Adjunction operations, and have recently reemerged in mainstream generative grammar in Minimalism, as the operations Merge and Move.

In generative phonology, another form of transformation is the phonological rule, which describes a mapping between an underlying representation (the phoneme) and the surface form that is articulated during natural speech.

==== Mathematical representation ====
An important feature of all transformational grammars is that they are more powerful than context-free grammars. Chomsky formalized this idea in the Chomsky hierarchy. He argued that it is impossible to describe the structure of natural languages with context-free grammars. His general position on the context-dependency of natural language has held up, though his specific examples of the inadequacy of CFGs in terms of their weak generative capacity were disproved.

== Core concepts ==
=== Innate linguistic knowledge ===
Using a term such as "transformation" may give the impression that theories of transformational generative grammar are intended as a model of the processes by which the human mind constructs and understands sentences, but Chomsky clearly stated that a generative grammar models only the knowledge that underlies the human ability to speak and understand, arguing that because most of that knowledge is innate, a baby can have a large body of knowledge about the structure of language in general and so need to learn only the idiosyncratic features of the language(s) to which it is exposed.

Chomsky is not the first person to suggest that all languages have certain fundamental things in common. He quoted philosophers who posited the same basic idea several centuries ago. But Chomsky helped make the innateness theory respectable after a period dominated by more behaviorist attitudes towards language. He made concrete and technically sophisticated proposals about the structure of language as well as important proposals about how grammatical theories' success should be evaluated.

=== Grammaticality ===
Chomsky argued that "grammatical" and "ungrammatical" can be meaningfully and usefully defined. In contrast, an extreme behaviorist linguist would argue that language can be studied only through recordings or transcriptions of actual speech and that the role of the linguist is to look for patterns in such observed speech, not to hypothesize about why such patterns might occur or to label particular utterances grammatical or ungrammatical. Few linguists in the 1950s actually took such an extreme position, but Chomsky was on the opposite extreme, defining grammaticality in an unusually mentalistic way for the time. He argued that the intuition of a native speaker is enough to define the grammaticality of a sentence; that is, if a particular string of English words elicits a double-take or a feeling of wrongness in a native English speaker, with various extraneous factors affecting intuitions controlled for, it can be said that the string of words is ungrammatical. That, according to Chomsky, is entirely distinct from the question of whether a sentence is meaningful or can be understood. It is possible for a sentence to be both grammatical and meaningless, as in Chomsky's famous example, "colorless green ideas sleep furiously". But such sentences manifest a linguistic problem that is distinct from that posed by meaningful but ungrammatical (non)-sentences such as "man the bit sandwich the", the meaning of which is fairly clear, but which no native speaker would accept as well-formed.

=== Theory evaluation ===
In the 1960s, Chomsky introduced two central ideas relevant to the construction and evaluation of grammatical theories.

==== Competence versus performance ====
One was the distinction between competence and performance. Chomsky noted that when people speak in the real world, they often make linguistic errors, such as starting a sentence and then abandoning it midway through. He argued that such errors in linguistic performance are irrelevant to the study of linguistic competence, the knowledge that allows people to construct and understand grammatical sentences. Consequently, the linguist can study an idealised version of language, which greatly simplifies linguistic analysis.

==== Descriptive versus explanatory adequacy ====
The other idea related directly to evaluation of theories of grammar. Chomsky distinguished between grammars that achieve descriptive adequacy and those that go further and achieve explanatory adequacy. A descriptively adequate grammar for a particular language defines the (infinite) set of grammatical sentences in that language; that is, it describes the language in its entirety. A grammar that achieves explanatory adequacy has the additional property that it gives insight into the mind's underlying linguistic structures. In other words, it does not merely describe the grammar of a language, but makes predictions about how linguistic knowledge is mentally represented. For Chomsky, such mental representations are largely innate and so if a grammatical theory has explanatory adequacy, it must be able to explain different languages' grammatical nuances as relatively minor variations in the universal pattern of human language.

Chomsky argued that even though linguists were still a long way from constructing descriptively adequate grammars, progress in descriptive adequacy would come only if linguists held explanatory adequacy as their goal: real insight into individual languages' structure can be gained only by comparative study of a wide range of languages, on the assumption that they are all cut from the same cloth.

== Historical context ==
Chomsky developed transformational grammar in the late 1950s, drawing on older work including that of the structuralists. Its central ideas are maintained to varying degrees in present-day approaches to syntax such as Minimalism, while others such as Combinatory categorial grammar are distinctly non-transformational.

== See also ==
- Antisymmetry
- Biolinguistics
- Generalised phrase structure grammar
- Generative semantics
- Head-driven phrase structure grammar
- Heavy NP shift
- Jerzy Kuryłowicz
- Lexical functional grammar
- Minimalist program
- Parasitic gap
- Structural linguistics
- Transformational syntax

== Bibliography ==
- Chomsky, Noam (1957), Syntactic Structures, The Hague/Paris: Mouton, ISBN 9783110172799
- Chomsky, Noam (1995). The Minimalist Program. MIT Press. ISBN 0-262-53128-3.
- Bauer, Laurie (2007). The linguistics studentʻs handbook. Edinburgh University Press. pp. 47–55. ISBN 978-0-7486-2758-5.
- Zwart, Jan-Wouter (1998). "Review Article: The Minimalist Program". Journal of Linguistics. 34. Cambridge University Press: 213–226. doi:10.1017/S0022226797006889. S2CID 1647815.
