= Well-formedness =

In linguistics, conformity with grammar

In linguistics, well-formedness is the quality of a clause, word, or other linguistic element that conforms to the grammar of the language of which it is a part. Well-formed words or phrases are grammatical, meaning they obey all relevant rules of grammar. In contrast, a form that violates some grammar rule is ill-formed and does not constitute a part of the language.

A word may be phonologically well-formed, meaning it conforms to the sound pattern of the language. For example, the nonce word wug coined by Jean Berko Gleason is phonologically well-formed, so informants are able to pluralize it regularly. A word, phrase, clause, or utterance may be grammatically well-formed, meaning it obeys the rules of morphology and syntax. A semantically well-formed utterance or sentence is one that is meaningful. Grammatical well-formedness and semantic well-formedness do not always coincide. For example, the following sentence is grammatically well-formed, but has no clear meaning.

Colorless green ideas sleep furiously.

The concept of well-formedness was developed in generative grammar during the twentieth century. Sometimes native speakers of a language do not agree whether a particular word, phrase, or clause is well-formed. This problem of gradient well-formedness, uncertainty about the well-formedness of a particular example, is a problem for generative linguistics, which assumes that grammar follows some universal patterns that should not vary among speakers.

== Gradient well-formedness ==
Gradient well-formedness is a problem that arises in the analysis of data in generative linguistics, in which a linguistic entity is neither completely grammatical nor completely ungrammatical. A native speaker may judge a word, phrase, or pronunciation as "not quite right" or "almost there," rather than dismissing it as completely unacceptable or fully accepting it as well-formed. Thus, the acceptability of the given entity lies on a "gradient" between well-formedness and ill-formedness. Some generative linguists think that ill-formedness might be strictly additive, thus trying to figure out universal constraints by acquiring scalar grammaticality judgments from informants. Generally, however, gradient well-formedness is considered an unsolved problem in generative linguistics.

== See also ==
- Accidental gap
- Constituent (linguistics)
- Garden-path sentence
- Validator
- Well-formed document
- Well-formed element
- Well-formed formula
