= Brainerd Kellogg =

American educator

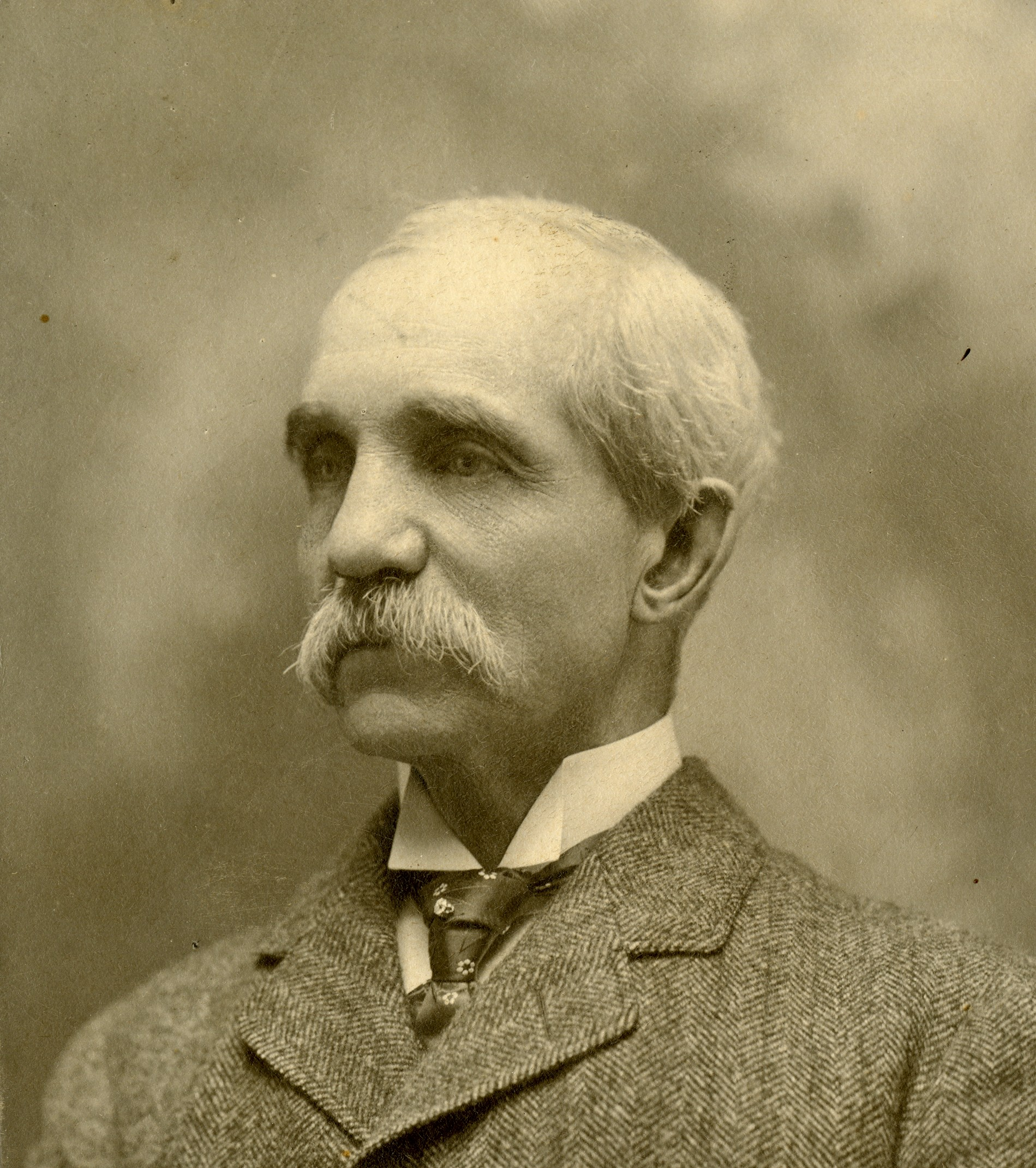
- Born: August 15, 1834; Champlain, New York
- Died: January 9, 1920 (aged 85); Morristown, New Jersey

Brainerd Kellogg (August 15, 1834 – January 9, 1920) was born in Champlain, New York. He was a Tutor (1860–1861) and Professor of Rhetoric and English Literature (1861–1868) at Middlebury College in Vermont, United States. From 1868 to 1907 he was professor at the Brooklyn Polytechnic Institute. He published a number of influential education books, some of which are available on Project Gutenberg, and a variety of textbooks on English writing and literature, including a series on the works of William Shakespeare.

Most methods of sentence diagramming in pedagogy are based on the Reed-Kellogg sentence diagram from the book Higher Lessons in English, first published in 1877, though the method has been updated with recent understanding of grammar. Reed and Kellogg were preceded, and their work probably informed, by W. S. Clark, who published his "balloon" method of depicting grammar in his 1847 book A Practical Grammar: in which Words, Phrases, and Sentences Are Classified According to their Offices and Their Various Relations to Each Another.

== Personal life ==
Kellogg married Julia Rogers Cutter on August 19, 1862 and had a son and daughter: Frederick and Julia [Mrs. S. Vilas Beckwith]. Kellogg died in Morristown, New Jersey on January 9, 1920.
