= Linguistic competence =

System of linguistic knowledge possessed by native speakers of a language

In linguistics, linguistic competence is the system of unconscious knowledge that one has when one knows a language. It is distinguished from linguistic performance, which includes all other factors that allow one to use language in practice.

In approaches to linguistics which adopt this distinction, competence would normally be considered responsible for the fact that "I like ice cream" is a possible sentence of English, the particular proposition that it denotes, and the particular sequence of phones that it consists of. Performance, on the other hand, would be responsible for the real-time processing required to produce or comprehend it, for the particular role it plays in a discourse, and for the particular sound wave one might produce while uttering it.

The distinction is widely adopted in formal linguistics, where competence and performance are typically studied independently. However, it is not used in other approaches including functional linguistics and cognitive linguistics, and it has been criticized in particular for turning performance into a wastebasket for hard-to-handle phenomena.

== Competence versus performance ==
Competence is the collection of subconscious rules that one knows when one knows a language; performance is the system which puts these rules to use. This distinction is related to the broader notion of Marr's levels used in other cognitive sciences, with competence corresponding to Marr's computational level.

For example, many linguistic theories, particularly in generative grammar, give competence-based explanations for why English speakers would judge the sentence in (1) as odd. In these explanations, the sentence would be ungrammatical because the rules of English only generate sentences where demonstratives agree with the grammatical number of their associated noun.

(1) *That cats is eating the mouse.

By contrast, generative theories generally provide performance-based explanations for the oddness of center embedding sentences like one in (2). According to such explanations, the grammar of English could in principle generate such sentences, but doing so in practice is so taxing on working memory that the sentence ends up being unparsable.

(2) *The cat that the dog that the man fed chased meowed.

In general, performance-based explanations deliver a simpler theory of grammar at the cost of additional assumptions about memory and parsing. As a result, the choice between a competence-based explanation and a performance-based explanation for a given phenomenon is not always obvious and can require investigating whether the additional assumptions are supported by independent evidence. For example, while many generative models of syntax explain island effects by positing constraints within the grammar, it has also been argued that some or all of these constraints are in fact the result of limitations on performance.

== Critiques ==
A broad front of linguists have critiqued the notion of linguistic competence, often severely. Proponents of usage-based approaches to linguistics argue that what generativists would call competence is in fact derived from performance.

Sociolinguists have argued that the competence-performance distinction basically serves to privilege data from certain linguistic genres and socio-linguistic registers as used by the prestige group, while discounting evidence from low-prestige genres and registers as being simply mis-performance.

Noted linguist John Lyons, who works on semantics, has said:

Chomsky's use of the term performance to cover everything that does not fall within the scope of a deliberately idealized and theoretically restricted concept of linguistic competence, was perhaps unfortunate.

Dell Hymes, quoting Lyons as above, says that "probably now there is widespread agreement" with the above statement.

Many linguists including M.A.K. Halliday and Labov have argued that the competence-performance distinction makes it difficult to explain language change and grammaticalization, which can be viewed as changes in performance rather than competence.

Another critique of the concept of linguistic competence is that it does not fit the data from actual usage where the felicity of an utterance often depends largely on the communicative context.

Neurolinguist Harold Goodglass has argued that performance and competence are intertwined in the mind, since, "like storage and retrieval, they are inextricably linked in brain damage."

Distributed representations, simple recurrent networks, and grammatical structure. resulted in a wide questioning of nativist assumptions underlying psycholinguistic work up to the nineties.

Some researchers working on discourse reject the competence-performance distinction due to the difficulty of determining whether an utterance is well-formed or not and the fact that dialogue is inherently interactive.

=== Pragmatics and communicative competence ===
Dell Hymes proposed a broadening of linguistic competence into what he called communicative competence. This notion included social aspects of language which generative linguists would have regarded as performance.

== Related areas of study ==
Linguistic competence is commonly used and discussed in many language acquisition studies. Some of the more common ones are in the language acquisition of children, aphasics and multilinguals.

=== Child language ===
The Chomskyan view of language acquisition argues that humans have an innate ability – universal grammar – to acquire language. However, a list of universal aspects underlying all languages has been hard to identify.

Another view, held by scientists specializing in Language acquisition, such as Tomasello, argues that young children's early language is concrete and item-based which implies that their speech is based on the lexical items known to them from the environment and the language of their caretakers. In addition, children do not produce creative utterances about past experiences and future expectations because they have not had enough exposure to their target language to do so. Thus, this indicates that the exposure to language plays more of a role in a child's linguistic competence than just their innate abilities.

=== Aphasia ===
Aphasia refers to a family of clinically diverse disorders that affect the ability to communicate by oral or written language, or both, following brain damage. In aphasia, the inherent neurological damage is frequently assumed to be a loss of implicit linguistic competence that has damaged or wiped out neural centers or pathways that are necessary for maintenance of the language rules and representations needed to communicate. The measurement of implicit language competence, although apparently necessary and satisfying for theoretic linguistics, is complexly interwoven with performance factors. Transience, stimulability, and variability in aphasia language use provide evidence for an access deficit model that supports performance loss.

=== Multilingualism ===
The definition of a multilingual (Note: The term multilingual is also commonly used to refer to a bilingual.) is one that has not always been very clear-cut. In defining a multilingual, the pronunciation, morphology and syntax used by the speaker in the language are key criteria used in the assessment. Sometimes the mastery of the vocabulary is also taken into consideration but it is not the most important criteria as one can acquire the lexicon in the language without knowing the proper use of it.

When discussing the linguistic competence of a multilingual, both communicative competence and grammatical competence are often taken into consideration as it is imperative for a speaker to have the knowledge to use language correctly and accurately. To test for grammatical competence in a speaker, grammaticality judgments of utterances are often used. Communicative competence on the other hand, is assessed through the use of appropriate utterances in different setting.

=== Understanding humor ===
Language is often implicated in humor. For example, the structural ambiguity of sentences is a key source for jokes. Take Groucho Marx's line from Animal Crackers: "One morning I shot an elephant in my pajamas; how he got into my pajamas I'll never know." The joke is funny because the main sentence could theoretically mean either that the speaker, while wearing pajamas, shot an elephant or the speaker shot an elephant that was inside his pajamas.

Propositions by linguists such as Victor Raskin and Salvatore Attardo have been made stating that there are certain linguistic mechanisms (part of our linguistic competence) underlying our ability to understand humor and determine if something was meant to be a joke. Raskin puts forth a formal semantic theory of humor, which is now widely known as the semantic script theory of humor (SSTH). The semantic theory of humour is designed to model the native speaker's intuition with regard to humor or, in other words, their humor competence. The theory models and thus defines the concept of funniness and is formulated for an ideal speaker-hearer community i.e. for people whose senses of humor are exactly identical. Raskin's semantic theory of humor consists of two components – the set of all scripts available to speakers and a set of combinatorial rules. The term script used by Raskin in his semantic theory is used to refer to the lexical meaning of a word. The function of the combinatorial rules is then to combine all possible meaning of the scripts. Hence, Raskin posits that these are the two components which allows us to interpret humor.

== See also ==
- Communicative competence
- Grammaticality
- Linguistic performance
