= Grammaticality =

Conformity of language to a grammar

In linguistics, grammaticality is conformity to grammar. The notion of grammaticality rose alongside the theory of generative grammar, the goal of which is to formulate rules that define well-formed, grammatical sentences. These rules of grammaticality also provide explanations of ill-formed, ungrammatical sentences.

In theoretical linguistics, a speaker's judgement on the well-formedness of a linguistic 'string'—called a grammaticality judgement—is based on whether the sentence is interpreted in accordance with the rules and constraints of the relevant grammar. If the rules and constraints of the particular lect are followed, then the sentence is judged to be grammatical. In contrast, an ungrammatical sentence is one that violates the rules of the given language variety.

Linguists use grammaticality judgements to investigate the syntactic structure of sentences. Generative linguists are largely of the opinion that for native speakers of natural languages, grammaticality is a matter of linguistic intuition, and reflects the innate linguistic competence of speakers. Therefore, generative linguists attempt to predict grammaticality judgements exhaustively.

Grammaticality judgements are largely based on an individual's linguistic intuition, and it has been pointed out that humans have the ability to understand as well as produce an infinitely large number of new sentences that have never been seen before. This allows us to accurately judge a sentence as grammatical or ungrammatical, even if it is a completely novel sentence.

== Background ==
=== Criteria that determine grammaticality ===
According to Chomsky, a speaker's grammaticality judgement is based on two factors:

1. A native speaker's linguistic competence, which is the knowledge that they have of their language, allows them to easily judge whether a sentence is grammatical or ungrammatical based on intuitive introspection. For this reason, such judgements are sometimes called introspective grammaticality judgements.
2. The context in which the sentence was uttered.

=== Criteria that do not determine grammaticality ===
In his study of grammaticality in the 1950s, Chomsky identified three criteria which cannot be used to determine whether a sentence is grammatical:

1. Whether the sentence is included in a corpus,
2. Whether the sentence is meaningful,
3. Whether the sentence is statistically probable.

To illustrate this point, Chomsky created the nonsensical sentence in (1), which does not occur in any corpus, is not meaningful, and is not statistically probable. However, the form of this sentence is judged to be grammatical by many native speakers of English. Such grammaticality judgements reflect the fact that the structure of sentence (1) obeys the rules of English grammar. This can be seen by comparing sentence (1) with sentence (2). Both sentences have the same structure, and both are grammatically well-formed.

(1) Colorless green ideas sleep furiously. (Chomsky 1957: 17)
(2) Harmless young children sleep quietly.

Sentence (1) is grammatical yet infelicitous, because the pragmatics of the verb 'sleep' cannot be expressed as an action carried out in a furious manner. Hence, a native speaker would rate this sentence as odd, or unacceptable, because the meaning does not make sense according to the English lexicon.

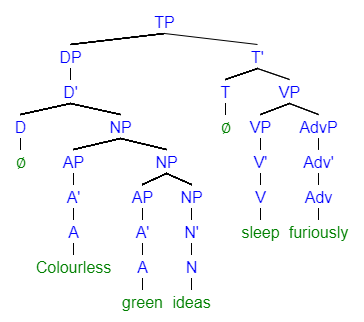
Tree structure of the sentence "Colourless green ideas sleep furiously."

Thus, for Chomsky a grammatical string is not necessarily a meaningful one. However, speakers can understand nonsensical strings by means of natural intonation. In addition, non-meaningful but grammatical sentences are often recalled more easily than ungrammatical sentences.

== Grammaticality versus acceptability ==
When Chomsky introduced the concept of grammaticality, he also introduced the concept of acceptability. Chomsky has emphasized that "the notion of 'acceptable' is not to be confused with 'grammatical.'"

For linguists such as Hopper, who stress the role of social learning in contrast to innate knowledge of language, there has been a gradual abandonment of talk about grammaticality in favour of acceptability.

Acceptability is:

1. A sentence that is consciously considered acceptable by both the speaker and hearer,
2. A natural, appropriate, and meaningful sentence within a context,
3. Related to a speaker's performance, and based on how a language would actually be used in a real situation,
4. Speaker-oriented, depending on what speakers consider appropriate.

On the other hand, grammaticality is:

1. A linguistic ‘string’ that follows a set of given rules,
2. A grammatical utterance that is not necessarily meaningful,
3. Based on a native speaker's competence or knowledge of a language,
4. Defined by the possible outputs a particular grammar can generate.

In experiments, grammaticality and acceptability are often confused, but speakers may be asked to give their 'grammatical judgments' instead of 'acceptability judgments'. The general assumption is that a native speaker's grammar produces grammatical strings and that the speaker can also judge whether the strings are acceptable in their language.

=== Gradience in acceptability ===
The traditional categorical interpretation of grammaticality is that a sentence is either grammatical or ungrammatical. Many modern linguists, including Sprouse, support this idea.

Acceptability judgments, on the other hand, fall in a continuous spectrum. Sentences may either be clearly acceptable or clearly unacceptable, but there are also sentences that are partially acceptable. Hence, according to Sprouse, the difference between grammaticality and acceptability is that grammatical knowledge is categorical, but acceptability is a gradient scale.

Linguists may use words, numbers, or typographical symbols such as question marks (?) or asterisks (*) to represent the judged acceptability of a linguistic string. During a judgment task, the speaker may report the acceptability of a sentence as acceptable, marginally acceptable, unacceptable, terrible, good, etc. Degrees of acceptability can also be represented by symbols such as ?, ??, *, **, or on a scale of 0-?-*-**, with 0 being acceptable and ** being unacceptable. On a seven-point scale, speakers can rate sentences from 1 (least acceptable) to 7 (most acceptable).

(3) *** The Sally hugged him the Thomas
(4) ** The Sally hugged him Thomas
(5) * The Sally hugged Thomas
(6) ??? Which the friend Thomas has painted a picture of?
(7) ?? Which friend Thomas had painted a picture of?
(8) ? Which friend has Thomas painted the picture of?

Note that examples (3)-(8) are open to interpretation as judgement is based entirely on intuition, and determination of grammaticality is dependent on one's theory of what the grammar is. Therefore, different individuals may assign the same sentence different degrees of acceptability. Some linguists believe that the informal use of these symbols is problematic because the exact meaning of the symbols have never been properly defined, and their usage is riddled with inconsistencies.

=== Frequency affects acceptability ===
Acceptability is about the actual use of a speaker's language in concrete situations. Since it is speaker-oriented, it is possible to find instances of sentences that are assumed to be acceptable but ungrammatical.

(9) But if this ever-changing world in which we live in

— Paul McCartney, Live and Let Die, 1973

Example (9) is ungrammatical, because the preposition in is copied. The rules of English prepositions only allow sentences such as (10a) and (10b), which show preposition pied-piping structure in (10a), and preposition stranding structure in (10b). Sentences (9) and (11c) are ungrammatical but acceptable because of the frequency with which people hear the structure.

(10) a. This world [in which] we live [ __ ] ...
 b. This world [which] we live in [ __ ] ...
 c. *This world [in which] we live in [ __ ] ...

Although (10c) is acceptable due to a frequency affect, sentences with preposition copying are judged to be ungrammatical, as shown in (11c).

(11) a. This table [on which] I put the book [ __ ] ...
 b. This table [which] I put the book on [ __ ] ...
 c. *This table [on which] I put the book on [ __ ] ...

=== Other factors that determine acceptability ===
The prevailing models on grammaticality since Chomsky postulated that the acceptability of sentences is a scale, with clearly acceptable on one side, clearly unacceptable on the other, and all manner of ranges of partial acceptability in between. To explain the scale of partial acceptability, linguists have said that phenomena other than grammatical knowledge—such as semantic plausibility, working memory limitations, etc.—account for speakers reporting acceptability on a scale. However, there are a few exceptions to this trend, including those who claim that "strength of violation" plays a role in grammaticality judgements. Examples of linguists of this persuasion include Huang's proposal that ECP violations are stronger than Subjacency violations, Chomsky's proposal that each barrier crossed leads to lower acceptability, and Optimality Theory (esp. Keller).

(12) Subjacency *[CP Whatj does [ TP Sue wonder [CP when I broke ___j]]]? (Sportiche 2014: 287)
(13) Barrier *Herselfj likes Maryj's mother

Subjacency says that you cannot relate two positions across two bounding nodes. In (12), we see that the movement of the wh-expression 'what' was moved past a Complementizer Phrase (CP) and a Tense Phrase (TP) to get to the specifier position of CP, thus this phrase is ungrammatical.

Within the past twenty years however, there has been a major shift in linguists' understanding of intermediate levels of acceptability. This is due to the increasing use of experimental methods to measure acceptability, making it possible to detect subtle differences along a scale of acceptability.

=== Norm-based evaluation ===
Prescriptive grammar of controlled natural languages defines grammaticality as a matter of explicit consensus. On this view, to consider a string as grammatical, it should conform with a set of norms. These norms are usually based on conventional rules that form a part of a higher or literary register for a given language. For some languages, a group of experts are appointed to define and regularly update these rules.

== Use of grammaticality judgments ==
=== Research methods of sentence processing ===
There are several methods that successfully investigate sentence processing, some of which include eye tracking, self-paced listening and reading, or cross-modal priming. The most productive method however, is real-time grammaticality judgements. A grammaticality judgement is a test which involves showing participants sentences that are either grammatical or ungrammatical. The participant must decide whether or not they find the sentences to be grammatical as quickly as possible. Grammaticality is cross-linguistic, so this method has therefore been used on a wide variety of languages.

=== Computer-assisted language instruction ===
Catt and Catt & Hirst created a model of grammaticality based around a computer program developed for computer-assisted language instruction which was designed to perform automatic error diagnosis and correction of ungrammaticalities produced by second-language learners. The program classified errors made by language-learners in their sentences as being due to errors in phrase structure, transformations, morphology, verb subcategorization, or by the languages-learners translating their primary language directly into the language they are learning. The program worked primarily by utilizing a parser which consisted of constraints which, if a first parsing attempt failed, could be selectively relaxed. Thus, for a given parse, the constraints which were relaxed indicated the precise nature and location of ungrammaticality.

=== Assessing first language (L1) competence ===
There have been experiments conducted in order to test how early speakers gain the ability to judge grammaticality in their native language. In an experiment by Cairns et al., preschool children aged 4–6 were presented sentences such as (14) and (15) orally. (To make sure that the meaning of the sentences was clear to the children, sentences were enacted with toys.) While sentence (14) is well-formed in the adult grammar, sentence (15) is not, as indicated by the asterisk (*). The source of the ill-formedness is that the verb hug is a transitive verb and so must have a direct object, namely something or someone who receives the action of the verb. Sentence (15) is missing the receiver of hug.

(14) The kitten hugged the pig. [Carin 2006: 215]
(15) *The zebra hugged. [Carin 2006: 215]

The results of this study show that the earliest age at which children can discriminate well-formed from ill-formed sentences, as well as correct these, is at 6 years. During the critical period between 4 and 6 years old, there is a significant increase in the accuracy of grammaticality judgments, since metalinguistic skill is in critical development; the judgment relies on the psycholinguistic ability of the child to access their internalized grammar and to compute whether it can or cannot generate the target sentence. This ability to judge the grammaticality of sentences seems to develop in children well after basic grammar skills have been established, and is related to early reading acquisition—acquisitionists generally believe that the ability to make grammaticality judgments is a measure of syntactic awareness.

=== Assessing second language (L2) competence ===
Grammaticality judgment tasks can also be used to assess the competence of language learners. Late learners of L2 perform worse on grammaticality judgment tasks or tests than native speakers or early acquirers, in that L2 learners are more likely to accept a sentence that is ungrammatical as grammatical. After the critical period, age of acquisition is no longer supposed to have an effect, and native-like performance is no longer supposed to be achievable. However, the idea that there is a critical period for the acquisition of syntactic competence, which is reflected by the ability to assess the well-formedness of a sentence, is controversial. On one view, biological or language-specific mechanisms become nonfunctional after a certain age. On another view, decreased L2 learning ability with age is not inevitable, and can be explained by factors such as motivation, learning environment, pressure, and time commitment. Although there is evidence that supports the claim that speakers outside the L2 mastery age range are not capable of acquiring native-like mastery of a language, there is also evidence supporting the opposite, as well as evidence for young learners not mastering an L2.

==== Performance-related factors ====
General processing problems, rather than a deficit in some syntax specific process or module, offer a viable explanation for populations that exhibit poor grammatical performance. Performance on L2 grammaticality judgments might be partially due to variable accessibility to and use of relevant grammatical knowledge. Difficulties in basic level cognitive processing are due to:

- low L2 memory capacity
- poor L2 decoding ability
- slow L2 processing speed

These issues have been tied to grammatical processing performance by testing native speakers of English on the same tasks under stressful conditions: there is shown to be difficulty in grammatical agreement when memory capacity is curtailed, important cues in the language when given noisy input, and processing important structures when not given enough time to process input. This shows that knowledge cannot always be automatically and consistently applied under stressful situations without having processing difficulties. However, these issues are not necessarily independent of each other, as low decoding ability of structure could affect processing speed. Overall, individual differences in L2 working memory and decoding ability are correlated to grammaticality judgment accuracy and latencies. However, there is no correlation between speed of processing measure and grammaticality judgment performance, age of arrival correlates with syntactic mastery, and knowledge of vocabulary probably drives grammaticality performance.

==== Age-related factors ====
Age for decrease of L2 grammaticality performance varies from early childhood to late adolescence, depending on the combinations of the speaker's first and second language. The age of acquisition at which L2 learners are worse than native speakers depends on how dissimilar the L1 and L2 are on phonological and grammatical level. For example, Chinese/English bilinguals at 7 years old perform just as well as Spanish/English bilinguals at 16 years old. This is due to the fact that a grammatical construction on an L2 that has a parallel structure in an L1 would impose less processing demand than one that does not have a parallel, causing a poorer performance on language structure.

There is evidence for late L2 learners generally having issues with plurals and past tense, and not so many issues with Subject-Verb-Object testing, in which they show native-like results; there is better performance on Yes/No as well as Wh- questions than on articles and past tense.

There is data supporting high-performing late learners well beyond the critical period: in an experiment testing grammaticality by J. L. McDonald, 7 out of 50 L2 English late-learner subjects had scores within range of native speakers. The results are linked to how individual differences in L2 memory capacity, decoding, or processing speed affect processing resources to automatically apply the relevant grammatical knowledge.

==== Reliability of L2 grammaticality judgments ====
The matter of reliability of L2 grammaticality judgments is an ongoing issue in the research field of second language acquisition. Undeniably, the case of second-language judgments involves participants to make judgments concerning their knowledge of a language system that is not necessarily complete compared to the knowledge of their first language. In an experiment, participants may encounter sentences beyond their current knowledge, resulting in guesswork. To minimize guessing, it is up to the linguists and researchers to select sentences that would better reflect a learner's knowledge of L2.

== Confounding factors in grammaticality judgements ==
=== Subject-related factors ===
==== Handedness ====
Studies have been conducted which explored the degree to which left or right handedness plays a role in idiolectal variation of grammaticality judgements, and have found that those with left-handed immediate family members, also referred to as familial sinistrality, perform differently than participants with only right handed family members. They suggest that those with familial sinistrality are less sensitive to violations of sentence structure likely due to a correlation between this group and a less localized language module in the brain. Cowart conducted a study specifically testing for the effects of familial sinistrality in grammatical judgement tasks. Using a 4-point scale, the experiment asked participants to judge sentences that followed the following model:

(17) a. What did the scientist criticize Max's proof of? 
 b. What did the scientist criticize a proof of?
 c. What did the scientist criticize the proof of? 
 d. Why did the scientist criticize Max's proof of the theorem?

Examples (17a-c) are structural violations, (17a) violates the Specified Subject Condition, and (17b-c) violate Subjacency, while (17d) is a grammatical control sentence. It was found that since the violations were structural in nature, participants with familial sinistrality were less sensitive to violations in such as the ones found(17a-c) while (17d) showed no variation between participant groups. In a similar study Bever, Carrithers, & Townsend found evidence that support Cowart's findings, also showing that no judgement differences were found when comparing groups across variables such as age, sex, and verbal SAT score.

=== Task-related factors ===
==== Repetition ====
There have been numerous studies addressing the effect of repetition on grammaticality judgements in experimental contexts. Repetition experiments are conducted by asking participants to give scaled ratings of sentences on their level of grammaticality. In the first phase, sentences are rated one at a time as a baseline measure of grammaticality level. In the repetition phase, participants rate each sentence after it has been displayed numerous times continuously, with short pauses between each repetition. They have generally found that repetition of a string significantly decreases participants grammaticality ratings of both grammatical and ungrammatical sentences. Two possible factors have been speculated to cause this affect, the first attributes this phenomenon to satiation, the phenomenon of prolonged repetition leading to illusory changes in perception. The second is that changes in participants’ judgement process occurred as a result of repetitions. Repetition effects have been shown to not be present when sentences are displayed along with a preceding sentence to give the string context.

==== Yes/no responses ====
When researchers interpret a yes/no response on grammaticality, they need to take into account of what the participants are responding to. The speaker could be rejecting the sentence for reasons other than its grammaticality, including the context or meaning of the sentence, a particular word choice, or other factors. For example, consider this ungrammatical sentence:

(16) The elephant are jumping.

A participant, whether an adult or a child, may reject this sentence because elephants do not jump. To avoid this misinterpretation, researchers need to clarify with the participants regarding the meaning of yes and no responses.

== Grammaticality illusion ==
Studies have shown that when native speakers judge ungrammatical sentences to be more acceptable than their grammatical counterpart, grammaticality illusion has occurred. Consider Frazier's example:

(18) The apartment that the maid who the service had sent over was cleaning every week was well decorated.
(19) *The apartment that the maid who the service had sent over was well decorated.

The English grammar allows structures such as sentence (18), while sentence (19) is not allowed. Notice that sentence (19) is missing the verb phrase "was cleaning every week."

In several studies, participants carried out offline and online tasks. In the offline task, the participants rated their comprehension of sentences on a five-point scale in a questionnaire. The result revealed that the ungrammatical sentences were rated as good as or even better than grammatical sentences.

In the online study, participants did a self-paced reading (SPR) task. The sentence appears on a computer monitor word-by-word. After each word, participants were asked to choose if the sentence is still grammatical so far. Then they would go on to rate the sentence from 1 "perfectly good English" to 7 "really bad English." The result showed that ungrammatical sentences were rated to be better than the grammatical ones.

=== Cross-linguistic differences ===
To find out if grammaticality illusion also occurs in other languages, linguists have carried out similar experiments with different languages.

Vasishth hypothesized that different word order could be a factor of grammaticality illusion. English sentences follow the order of subject, verb, object (SVO) while both German and Dutch have the subject, object, verb (SOV) order. Based on the results, German and Dutch participants do not show the effect of the illusion. However, if they were shown the sentences in English, they also show the illusion.

Examples of grammatical and ungrammatical sentences in German:

(20) Der Anwalt, den der Zeuge, den der Spion betrachtete, schnitt, überzeugte den Richter.
(21) *Der Anwalt, den der Zeuge, den der Spion betrachtete, überzeugte den Richter.

Sentence (20) is grammatical, whereas sentence (21) is ungrammatical.

=== Possible causes ===
Gibson and Thomas concludes from their offline acceptability ratings that working-memory overload causes native speakers to prefer the ungrammatical sentence. The shorter, ungrammatical sentences were easier to process and made more sense. The grammatical sentence with several embedded clauses, such as "was cleaning every week", may require high-memory load, making it difficult for the participants to comprehend the sentence.

Studies of grammaticality illusion in other languages such as Dutch and German suggest that different language structures prevent participants from making incorrect judgments. For example, a three-verb sequence in subordinate clauses is more common in German or Dutch than in English. As a result, German or Dutch participants are well able to correctly rule out the ungrammatical sentences with the missing verb phrase.

== See also ==
- Acceptability judgment task
- Common English usage misconceptions
- Constituent (linguistics)
- Error (linguistics)
- List of linguistic example sentences
- Universal grammar
- Transformational grammar
