= Syntactic Structures =

1957 book by Noam Chomsky

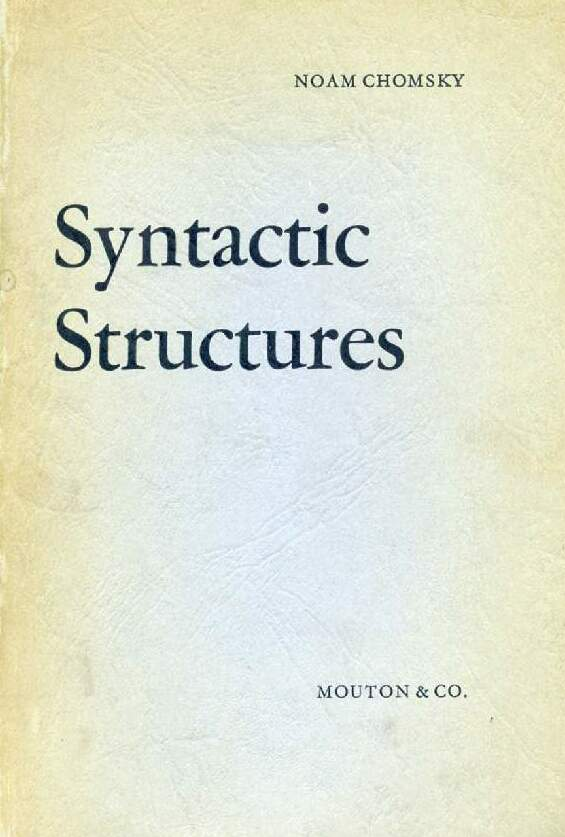
- First edition cover
- Author: Noam Chomsky
- Language: English
- Subject: Natural language syntax
- Publisher: Mouton & Co.
- Publication date: February 1957
- Media type: Print
- Pages: 117

Syntactic Structures is a seminal work in linguistics by American linguist Noam Chomsky, originally published in 1957. A short monograph of about a hundred pages, it is recognized as one of the most significant and influential linguistic studies of the 20th century. It contains the now-famous sentence "Colorless green ideas sleep furiously", which Chomsky offered as an example of a grammatically correct sentence that has no discernible meaning, thus arguing for the independence of syntax (the study of sentence structures) from semantics (the study of meaning). (Note: From Chomsky 1957, p. 103:"...such semantic notions as reference, significance, and synonymity played no role in the discussion.")

Based on lecture notes he had prepared for his students at the Massachusetts Institute of Technology in the mid-1950s, (Note: Chomsky is quoted in Riemsdijk & Huybregts 1982, p. 63 saying: "It [Syntactic Structures] was course notes for an undergraduate course at MIT. Van Schooneveld [a Dutch linguist who was associated with Mouton] showed up here once and took a look at some of my course notes from the undergraduate course I was teaching and said I ought to publish it." In (Dillinger & Palácio 1997, pp. 162–163), Chomsky recounted: "At the time Mouton was publishing just about anything, so they decided they'd publish it along with a thousand other worthless things that were coming out. That's the story of Syntactic Structures: course notes for undergraduate science students published by accident in Europe." The publication of Syntactic structures is also discussed in Noordegraaf 2001 and van Schooneveld 2001.) Syntactic Structures was Chomsky's first book on linguistics and reflected the contemporary developments in early generative grammar. In it, Chomsky introduced his idea of a transformational generative grammar, succinctly synthesizing and integrating the concepts of transformation (pioneered by his mentor Zellig Harris, but used in a precise and integrative way by Chomsky), morphophonemic rules (introduced by Leonard Bloomfield) and an item-and-process style of grammar description (developed by Charles Hockett). Here, Chomsky's approach to syntax is fully formal (based on symbols and rules). At its base, Chomsky uses phrase structure rules, (Note: From Chomsky 1957, p. 102: "In §§3-7 we outlined the development of some fundamental linguistic concepts in purely formal terms.") which break down sentences into smaller parts. These are combined with a new kind of rules which Chomsky called "transformations". This procedure gives rise to different sentence structures. Chomsky stated that this limited set of rules "generates" (Note: Here, "generate" means giving a clear structural description of each sentence. In Chomsky 1965, p. 9, Chomsky writes that "When we speak of a grammar as generating a sentence with a certain structural description, we mean simply that the grammar assigns this structural description to the sentence.") all and only the grammatical sentences of a given language, which are infinite in number (not too dissimilar to a notion introduced earlier by Danish linguist Louis Hjelmslev). Although not explicitly stated in the book itself, this way of study was later interpreted to have valued language's innate place in the mind over language as learned behavior, (Note: According to Steinberg, Hiroshi & Aline 2013, p. 371: "[Chomsky's generative system of rules] was more powerful that anything ... psycholinguists had heretofore had at their disposal. [It] was of special interest to these theorists. Many psychologists were quick to attribute generative systems to the minds of speakers and quick to abandon ... Behaviorism.") (Note: According to Joseph 2002, p., Hjelmslev and other European linguists, in contrast, had considered the generative calculus as perfectly non-psychological. See also Hjelmslev 1969)

Written when Chomsky was still an unknown scholar, (Note: Pullum 2011 writes: "[Chomsky] was at the time an unknown 28-year-old who taught language classes at MIT") Syntactic Structures had a major impact on the study of knowledge, mind and mental processes, becoming an influential work in the formation of the field of cognitive science. It also significantly influenced research on computers and the brain. (Note: See the "Reception" section of this article.) The importance of Syntactic Structures lies in Chomsky's persuasion for a biological perspective on language at a time when it was unusual, and in the context of formal linguistics. The book led to Chomsky's eventual recognition as one of the founders of what is now known as sociobiology. Some specialists have questioned Chomsky's theory, believing it is wrong to describe language as an ideal system. They also say it gives less value to the gathering and testing of data. (Note: See the "Criticisms" section of this article.) Nevertheless, Syntactic Structures is credited to have changed the course of linguistics in general and American linguistics in particular in the second half of the 20th century.

== Background ==
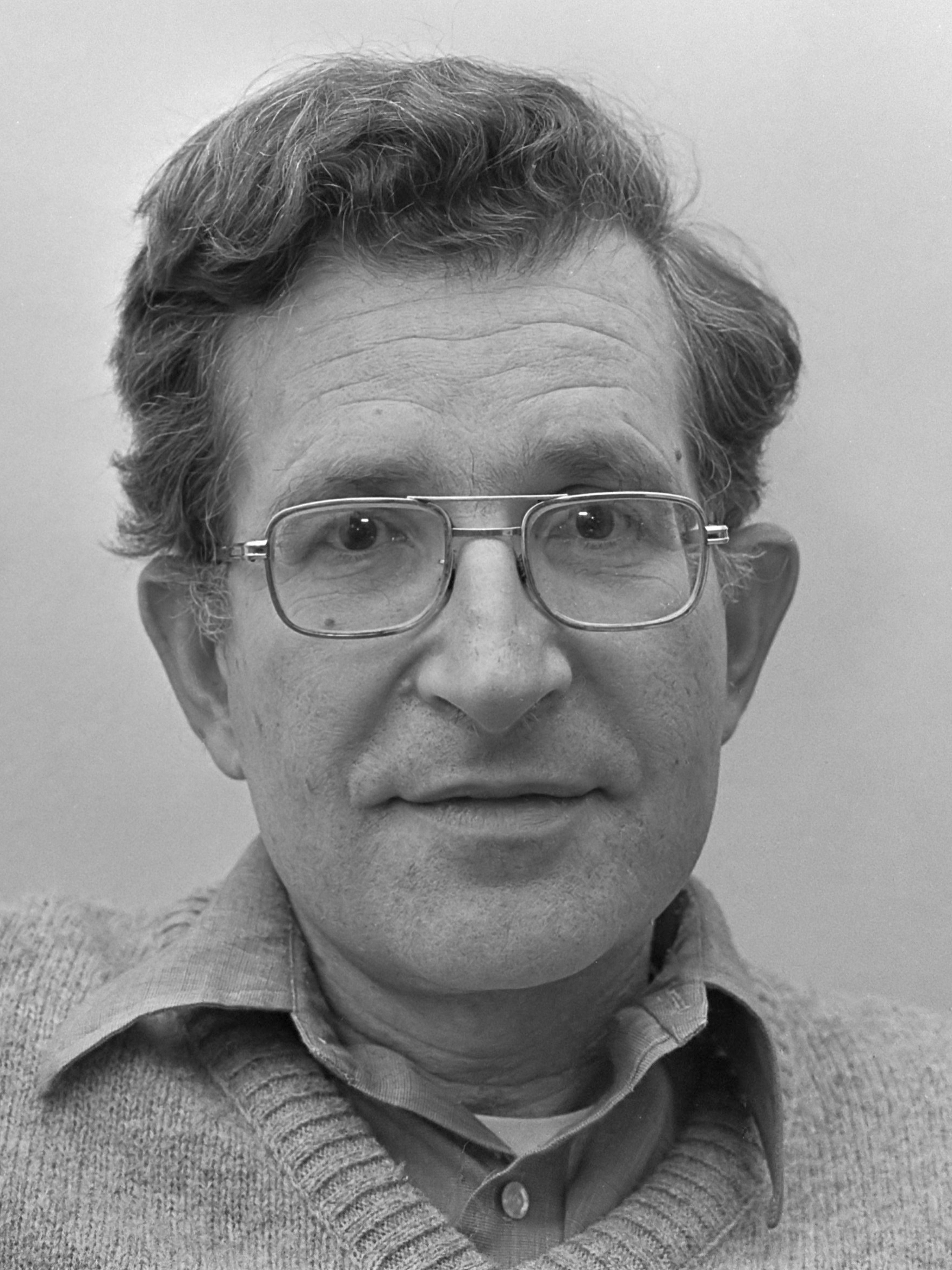
Noam Chomsky, the author of Syntactic Structures (1977 photo)

Chomsky's interest in language started at an early age. When he was twelve, he studied Hebrew grammar under his father. (Note: Specifically, Chomsky read David Kimhi's Hebrew Grammar (Mikhlol) (1952), an annotated study of a 13th century Hebrew grammar. It was written by his father, William Chomsky, one of the leading Hebrew scholars at the time. See Barsky 1997, p. 10) He also studied Arabic in his first year at the University of Pennsylvania. (Note: For its similarity to Hebrew. See Barsky 1997, p. 47 and "Noam Chomsky interviewed by David Samuels". Chomsky.info.) In 1947, he met Zellig Harris, the founder of the college's linguistics department. Harris was an established linguist. He did research in the way laid out by American linguist Leonard Bloomfield. He let Chomsky proofread a copy of his book Methods in Structural Linguistics (1951). (Note: In the 1947 preface of Harris 1951, Zellig Harris writes that “N. Chomsky has given much-needed assistance with the manuscript.") This is how Chomsky came to know a formal theory of linguistics. He soon decided to major in the subject. (Note: In his preface to Chomsky 1975, Chomsky writes that “My introduction to the field of linguistics was in 1947, when Zellig Harris gave me the proofs of his 'Methods in Structural Linguistics' to read.")

For his thesis, Chomsky set out to apply Harris's methods to Hebrew. Following Harris's advice, he studied logic, philosophy, and mathematics. He found Harris's views on language much like Nelson Goodman's work on philosophical systems. (Note: Especially Goodman's work on constructional systems and on the inadequacy of inductive approaches. See Chomsky 1975, p. 33. Goldsmith & Huck 1995, p. 24 writes: "Chomsky has said that he was convinced from his days as a student of Goodman's that there is no inductive learning.") Chomsky was also influenced by the works of W. V. O. Quine (Note: Chomsky 1975, p. 33 writes: "Quine's critiques of logical empiricism also gave some reason to believe that [a non-taxonomic approach to linguistic theory] might be a plausible one.") and Rudolf Carnap. (Note: Otero 1994 states that among non-American philosophers, it was only Rudolf Carnap whom Chomsky read as a student (p. 3)) (Note: Tomalin 2003 writes that "It is well known that Carnap's post-Aufbau work (especially Logische Syntax der Sprache) influenced Chomsky directly to some extent.") Quine showed that one cannot completely verify the meaning of a statement through observations. Carnap had developed a formal theory of language. It used symbols and rules that did not refer to meaning.

From there on, Chomsky tried to build a grammar of Hebrew. Such a grammar would generate the phonetic or sound forms of sentences. To this end, he organized Harris's methods in a different way. (Note: Joseph, Love & Taylor 2001, p. 125 states: "The most significant discontinuity [between Harris's Methods and Chomsky's Syntactic Structures] is Chomsky's inversion of Harris's analytic procedures.") To describe sentence forms and structures, he came up with a set of recursive rules. These are rules that refer back to themselves. He also found that there were many different ways of presenting the grammar. He tried to develop a method to measure how simple a grammar is. (Note: Tomalin 2006, p. 116 writes: "[Echoing] Goodman's pro-simplicity arguments ... the task of creating ... a simplicity measure is precisely the one Chomsky sets for himself in Chapter 4 of LSLT.") For this, he looked for "generalizations" among the possible sets of grammatical rules. (Note: Chomsky 1951, p. 5 states: "We want the reduction of the number of elements and statements, any generalizations ... to increase the total simplicity of the grammar") Chomsky completed his undergraduate thesis The Morphophonemics of Modern Hebrew in 1949. He then published a revised and expanded version of it as his master's thesis in 1951.

In 1951, Chomsky became a Junior Fellow at Harvard University. There, he tried to build an all-formal linguistic theory. (Note: Before Chomsky, Israeli mathematician and linguist Yehoshua Bar-Hillel had already shown in Bar-Hillel 1953 that formal languages and methods used in symbolic logic can be adapted to analyze human languages.) It was a clear break with the existing tradition of language study. In 1953, Chomsky published his first paper as a scholar. In it he tried to adapt the symbol-based language of logic to describe the syntax of a human language. During his fellowship, Chomsky organized all his ideas into a huge manuscript. It was around 1,000 typewritten pages long. He gave it the title The Logical Structure of Linguistic Theory (LSLT).

In 1955, Chomsky found a job at MIT. He worked there as a linguist in the mechanical translation project. The same year he submitted his doctoral dissertation to the University of Pennsylvania. The university granted him a Ph.D. for his thesis Transformational Analysis. In fact, it was just the ninth chapter of LSLT.

== Publication ==
In 1955, Chomsky had a doctorate in linguistics. Even so, he struggled at first to publish his theory and views on language. He offered the manuscript of The Logical Structure of Linguistic Theory (LSLT) for publication. But MIT's Technology Press refused to publish it. He also saw a paper promptly rejected by the academic linguistics journal WORD. (Note: Chomsky writes in Chomsky 1979, pp. 131–132: "As for the reception accorded to LSLT [the Logical Structure of Linguistic Theory], there is little to say. I've already told you that I did not have the impression the reaction on the part of linguists was surprising. I offered LSLT to the MIT-Press – who refused it. Quite rightly, I think, because at that time the situation was very unfavourable for a general book on that subject, especially one by an unknown author. I also submitted a technical article on simplicity and explanation to the journal Word, at the suggestion of Roman Jakobson, but it was rejected virtually by return mail. So I had little hope of seeing any of this work published, at least in a linguistic journal.") So he remained an outsider to the field of linguistics. His reviews and articles at the time were mostly published in non-linguistic journals. (Note: In particular, Chomsky wrote an academic paper in 1956 titled Three Models for the Description of Language published in the technological journal IRE Transactions on Information Theory (Chomsky 1956). It foreshadows many of the concepts presented in Syntactic Structures.)

Mouton & Co. was a Dutch publishing house based in The Hague. They had gained academic reputation by publishing works on Slavic Studies since 1954. Particularly, they had published works by linguists Nicolaas van Wijk and Roman Jakobson. Soon they started a new series called Janua Linguarum or the "Gate of Languages." It was intended to be a series of "small monographs" on general linguistics. (Note: The series's editor van Schooneveld is quoted thus in Hinrichs 2001, pp. 5–6: "I had originally conceived of the Janua as a series of small monographs of the size of a large article, too interesting to get drowned in a periodical amongst other contributions and to be lost to oblivion by the current of time.") The first volume of the Janua Linguarum series was written by Roman Jakobson and Morris Halle. It was called Fundamentals of Language, published in 1956. Chomsky had already met Jakobson, a professor at Harvard University, during his fellowship years. Halle was Chomsky's graduate classmate at Harvard and then a close colleague at MIT. In 1956, Chomsky and Halle collaborated to write an article on phonology, published in a 1956 festschrift for Jakobson.

Cornelis van Schooneveld was the editor of the Janua Linguarum series at Mouton. He was a Dutch linguist and a direct student of Jakobson. He was looking for monographs to publish for his series. Consequently, he visited Chomsky at MIT in 1956. With Morris Halle's (and possibly Jakobson's) mediation, Chomsky showed van Schooneveld his notes for his introductory linguistics course for undergraduate students. Van Schooneveld took an interest in them. He offered to publish an elaborate version of them at Mouton, to which Chomsky agreed.

Chomsky then prepared a manuscript of the right size (no longer than 120 pages) (Note: According to Hinrichs 2001, p. 7, Peter de Ridder, the managing director of Mouton, wrote to van Schooneveld that "new titles in the series [should be] no bigger than about 120 pages.") that would fit the series. After revising an earlier manuscript, Chomsky sent a final version in the first week of August in 1956 to van Schooneveld. (Note: A scan of Chomsky's own typewritten letter dated 5 August 1956 to Mouton editor Cornelis van Schooneveld can be found in Hamans 2014. This letter accompanied the final version of the manuscript.) The editor had Chomsky rename the book's title to Syntactic Structures for commercial purposes. (Note: Hinrichs 2001, p. 7 mentions De Ridder writing to van Schooneveld that "I am convinced that the book will sell well with this title.")

Soon after the book's first publication, Bernard Bloch, editor of the prestigious journal Language, gave linguist Robert Benjamin Lees, a colleague of Chomsky's at MIT, the opportunity to write a review of the book. Lees's very positive (Note: Oenbring 2009 remarks that Lees's review was "hyperbolic", his language "loaded" and Harris 1993 refers to Lees as "Chomsky's Huxley", referring to the proselytizing "bulldog" role played by Thomas Henry Huxley in defense of Charles Darwin's theories on evolution. Voegelin 1958 considers Lees to be "Chomsky's explicator". Chomsky himself considers Lees's review "provocative." (Chomsky 1975, p. 3)) essay-length review appeared in the July–September 1957 issue of Language. This early but influential review made Syntactic Structures visible on the linguistic research landscape. Shortly thereafter the book created a putative "revolution" in the discipline. (Note: Thorne 1965 remarked that "a revolution of the kind Kuhn describes has recently taken place in linguistics – dating from the publication of Chomsky's Syntactic Structures in 1957". According to Sklar 1968: "What has happened in linguistics since Chomsky appeared on the scene almost perfectly fits Kuhn's description of how a scientific revolution works." Searle 1972 writes that "[Chomsky's] revolution followed fairly closely the general pattern described in Thomas Kuhn's The Structure of Scientific Revolutions".) Later, some linguists began to question whether this was really a revolutionary breakthrough. A critical and elaborate account is given in Chomskyan (R)evolutions. Although Frederick Newmeyer states that "the publication of Syntactic structures has had profound effects, both intellectually for the study of language and sociologically for the field of linguistic", John R. Searle, three decades after his original review, wrote that "Judged by the objectives stated in the original manifestoes, the revolution has not succeeded. Something else may have succeeded, or may eventually succeed, but the goals of the original revolution have been altered and in a sense abandoned." As for LSLT, it would be 17 more years before it saw publication.

Syntactic Structures was the fourth book in the Janua Linguarum series. It was the series's bestselling book. It was reprinted 13 times until 1978. In 1962, a Russian translation by Konstantin Ivanovich Babisky, titled Синтакси́ческие структу́ры (Sintaksychyeskiye Struktury), was published in Moscow. In 1963, Yasuo Isamu wrote a Japanese translation of the book, named Bunpō no kōzō (文法の構造). In 1969, a French translation by Michel Braudeau, titled Structures Syntaxiques, was published by Éditions du Seuil in Paris. In 1973, Mouton published a German translation by Klaus-Peter Lange, titled Strukturen der Syntax. The book has also been translated into Korean, Spanish, Italian, Czech, Serbo-Croatian and Swedish languages.

== Contents ==
=== Goals of syntactic investigation ===
In Syntactic Structures, Chomsky tries to construct a "formalized theory of linguistic structure". He places emphasis on "rigorous formulations" and "precisely constructed models". In the first chapter of the book, he gives a definition of human language syntax. He then talks about the goals of syntactic study. For Chomsky, a linguist's goal is to build a grammar of a language. He defines grammar as a device which produces all the sentences of the language under study. Secondly, a linguist must find the abstract concepts beneath grammars to develop a general method. This method would help select the best possible device or grammar for any language given its corpus. Finally, a linguistic theory must give a satisfactory description of all the levels of language analysis. Examples of these levels include sounds, words and sentence structures.

=== Grammaticality ===
A tree diagram of the sentence "Colorless green ideas sleep furiously"

The second chapter is titled "The Independence of Grammar". In it, Chomsky states that a language is "a set ... of sentences, each finite in length and constructed out of a finite set of elements". A linguist should separate the "grammatical sequences" or sentences of a language from the "ungrammatical sequences". By a "grammatical" sentence Chomsky means a sentence that is intuitively "acceptable to a native speaker". It is a sentence pronounced with a "normal sentence intonation". It is also "recall[ed] much more quickly" and "learn[ed] much more easily".

Chomsky then analyzes further about the basis of "grammaticality." He shows three ways that do not determine whether a sentence is grammatical or not. First, a grammatical sentence need not be included in a corpus. Secondly, it need not be meaningful. Finally, it does not have to be statistically probable. Chomsky shows all three points using a nonsensical sentence "Colorless green ideas sleep furiously." Chomsky concludes that "grammar is autonomous and independent of meaning." He adds that "probabilistic models give no particular insight into some of the basic problems of syntactic structure."

==== Carnap's influence ====
British linguist Marcus Tomalin stated that a version of "Colorless green ideas sleep furiously" was suggested decades earlier by Rudolf Carnap. This German philosopher offered in 1934 the pseudo-sentence "Piroten karulieren elatisch". According to American linguist Reese Heitner, Carnap's sentence showed the autonomy of both syntactic and phonological structures. (Note: According to Heitner 2005: "[Carnap's sentence] actually does the double duty of demonstrating the "autonomy" of syntactic and phonological structure, an indication that not only can sentences be recognized as syntactically well-formed, but individual words can also be recognized as phonologically well-formed independent of semantics.")

=== Grammar models and transformations ===
In the third chapter titled "An Elementary Linguistic Theory", Chomsky tries to determine what sort of device or model gives an adequate account of a given set of "grammatical" sentences. Chomsky hypothesizes that this device has to be finite instead of infinite. He then considers finite state grammar, a communication theoretic model (Note: Specifically, the model proposed in Shannon & Weaver 1949) which treats language as a Markov process. Then in the fourth chapter titled "Phrase Structure", he discusses phrase structure grammar, a model based on immediate constituent analysis. In the fifth chapter titled "Limitations of Phrase Structure Description", he claims to show that both these models are inadequate for the purpose of linguistic description. As a solution, he introduces transformational generative grammar (TGG), "a more powerful model ... that might remedy these inadequacies."

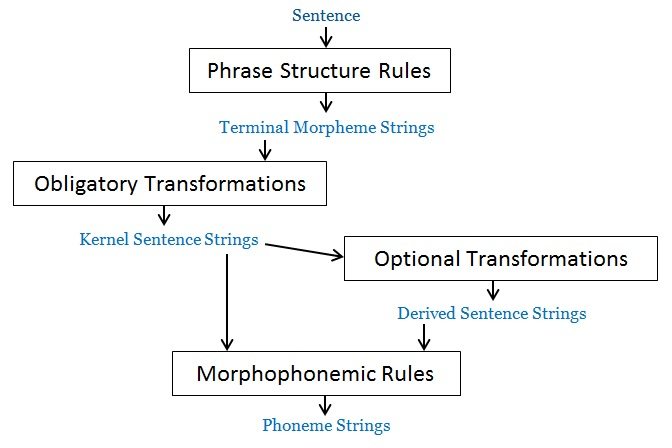
The grammar model discussed in Noam Chomsky's Syntactic Structures (1957)

Chomsky's transformational grammar has three parts: phrase structure rules, transformational rules and morphophonemic rules. The phrase structure rules are used for expanding lexical categories and for substitutions. These yield a string of morphemes. A transformational rule "operates on a given string ... with a given constituent structure and converts it into a new string with a new derived constituent structure." It "may rearrange strings or may add or delete morphemes." Transformational rules are of two kinds: obligatory or optional. Obligatory transformations applied on the "terminal strings" of the grammar produce the "kernel of the language". Kernel sentences are simple, active, declarative and affirmative sentences. To produce passive, negative, interrogative or complex sentences, one or more optional transformation rules must be applied in a particular order to the kernel sentences. At the final stage of the grammar, morphophonemic rules convert a string of words into a string of phonemes. Chomsky then applies this idea of transformational rules in the English auxiliary verb system.

==== Borrowing of terminology ====
In Syntactic Structures, the term "transformation" was borrowed from the works of Zellig Harris. Harris's formal model of language analysis was called transformational generative grammar. Harris was Chomsky's initial mentor. Harris used the term "transformation" to describe equivalence relations between sentences of a language. By contrast, Chomsky used the term to describe a formal rule applied to underlying structures of sentences.

Chomsky borrowed the term "generative" from the work of mathematician Emil Post. (Note: In Chomsky 1959, Chomsky writes that he was "following a familiar technical use of the term "generate," cf. Post 1944". In Chomsky 1965, p. 9, Chomksy justifies his choice of the term "generate", writing that "the term 'generate' is familiar in the sense intended here in logic, particularly in Post's theory of combinatorial systems. Furthermore, 'generate' seems to be the most appropriate translation for Humboldt's term erzeugen, which he frequently uses, it seems, in essentially the sense here intended. Since this use of the term 'generate' is well established both in logic and in the tradition of linguistic theory.") Post wanted to "mechanically [derive] inferences from an initial axiomatic sentence". Chomsky applied Post's work on logical inference to describe sets of strings (sequence of letters or sounds) of a human language. When he says a finite set of rules "generate" (i.e. "recursively enumerate") the set of potentially infinite number of sentences of a particular human language, he means that they provide an explicit, structural description of those sentences. (Note: In Chomsky 1965, p. 8, Chomsky writes that "by a generative grammar I mean simply a system of rules that in some explicit and well-defined way assigns structural descriptions to sentences.")

=== Justification of grammars ===
In the sixth chapter titled "On the Goals of Linguistic Theory", Chomsky writes that his "fundamental concern" is "the problem of justification of grammars". He draws parallels between the theory of language and theories in physical sciences. He compares a finite corpus of utterances of a particular language to "observations". He likens grammatical rules to "laws" which are stated in terms of "hypothetical constructs" such as phonemes, phrases, etc. According to Chomsky, the criteria for the "justification of grammars" are "external conditions of adequacy", the "condition of generality" and "simplicity". To choose the best possible grammar for a given corpus of a given language, Chomsky shows his preference for the "evaluation procedure" (which uses the aforementioned criteria). He rejects the "discovery procedure" (Note: Chomsky 1957, p. 55 writes: "Our main point is that a linguistic theory should not be identified with a manual of useful procedures, nor should it be expected to provide mechanical procedures for the discovery of grammars") (employed in structural linguistics and supposed to automatically and mechanically produce the correct grammar of a language from a corpus (Note: Sampson 1980, pp. 76 notes that "the fullest and most interesting expression of 'discovery procedure' is [the] book Methods in Structural Linguistics (Harris 1951) by Zellig Harris, Chomsky's mentor.)). He also dismisses the "decision procedure" (supposed to automatically choose the best grammar for a language from a set of competing grammars). Chomsky thus shows preference for "explanatory depth" with some "empirical inadequacies" over the pursuit of very detailed empirical coverage of all data. (Note: See Chomsky 1978, pp. 9–10. Chomsky characterized this approach as the "Galilean Style" of inquiry which had already been applied in modern natural sciences with "great success" since the 17th century.)

=== Application of transformational grammar in English ===
In the seventh chapter titled "Some Transformations in English", Chomsky strictly applies his just-proposed transformation-based approach on some aspects of English. He treats at length the formation of English negative passive sentences, yes-no and wh- interrogative sentences, etc. He claims in the end that transformational analysis can describe "a wide variety of ... distinct phenomena" in English grammar in a "simple", "natural" and "orderly" way. (Note: Chomsky 1957, p. 68 states:"a wide variety of apparently distinct phenomena [in English language] all fall into place in a very simple and natural way when we adopt the viewpoint of transformational analysis and that, consequently, the grammar of English becomes much more simple and orderly.")

=== Constructional homonymity and distinct levels of linguistic analysis ===
In the eighth chapter titled "The explanatory power of linguistic theory", Chomsky writes a linguistic theory cannot content itself by just generating valid grammatical sentences. It also has to account for other structural phenomena at different levels of linguistic representation. At a certain linguistic level, there can be two items which can be understood having different meanings but they are structurally indistinguishable within that level. This is called a "constructional homonymity" [sic]. The relevant ambiguity can be resolved by establishing a higher level of linguistic analysis. At this higher level, the two items can be clearly shown having two different structural interpretations. In this way, constructional homonymities at the phonemic level can be resolved by establishing the level of morphology, and so forth. One of the motivations of establishing a distinct, higher level of linguistic analysis is, then, to explain the structural ambiguity due to the constructional homonymities at a lower level. On the other hand, each linguistic level also captures some structural similarities within the level that are not explained in lower levels. Chomsky uses this argument as well to motivate the establishment of distinct levels of linguistic analysis.

Chomsky then shows that a grammar which analyzes sentences up to the phrase structure level contains many constructional homonymities at the phrase structure level where the resulting ambiguities need to be explained at a higher level. Then he shows how his newly invented "transformational level" can naturally and successfully function as that higher level. He further claims that any phrase structure grammar which cannot explain these ambiguities as successfully as transformational grammar does must be considered "inadequate".

=== Role of semantics in syntax ===
In the ninth chapter titled "Syntax and Semantics", Chomsky reminds that his analysis so far has been "completely formal and non-semantic." He then offers many counterexamples to refute some common linguistic assertions about grammar's reliance on meaning. He concludes that the correspondence between meaning and grammatical form is "imperfect", "inexact" and "vague." Consequently, it is "relatively useless" to use meaning "as a basis for grammatical description". To support his point, Chomsky considers a similar relation between semantics and phonology. He shows that in order to build a theory of phonemic distinction based on meaning would entail "complex", "exhaustive" and "laborious investigation" of an "immense", "vast corpus". By contrast, phonemic distinctness can be easily explained in a "straightforward" way and in "completely non-semantic terms" with the help of "pair tests". Chomsky also claims that a strictly formal, non-semantic framework of syntactic theory might ultimately be useful to support a parallel independent semantic theory. (Note: Because it would "reveal" insights about sentence structures. See Chomsky 1957, p. 103)

== Rhetorical style ==
Randy Allen Harris, a specialist of the rhetoric of science, writes that Syntactic Structures "appeals calmly and insistently to a new conception" of linguistic science. He finds the book "lucid, convincing, syntactically daring, the calm voice of reason ... [speaking] directly to the imagination and ambition of the entire field." It also bridged the "rhetorical gulf" to make the message of The Logical Structure of Linguistic Theory (a highly abstract, mathematically dense, and "forbiddingly technical" work) more palatable to the wider field of linguists. In a more detailed examination of the book, Harris finds Chomsky's argumentation in Syntactic Structures "multilayered and compelling". Chomsky not only makes a logical appeal (i.e. logos) to a highly formalized model of language, but also appeals explicitly and tacitly to the ethos of science.

In particular, Chomsky's analysis of the complex English auxiliary verb system in Syntactic Structures had great rhetorical effect. It combined simple phrase structure rules with a simple transformational rule. This treatment was based entirely on formal simplicity. Various linguists have described it as "beautiful", "powerful", "elegant", "revealing", "insightful", "beguiling" and "ingenious". (Note: Newmeyer 1987, p. 24 wrote that “[Chomsky’s] examples of defects of phrase structure grammar were illustrated simultaneously with the demonstration that grammars containing the more powerful transformational rules can handle the same phenomena in an elegant and revealing manner.”) (Note: According to Brown 2010, p. 188, "this apparently curious analysis is rather ingenious" and "the powerful tool of different levels of structure related by transformations was particularly beguiling, since transformations appeared to offer a means of explaining the often amazingly complex relationships between the forms of sentences and their understanding.") (Note: In his introduction to Syntactic Structures (Chomsky 1957, p. ix), American linguist David Lightfoot wrote that "this ingenious transformation...avoided hopelessly complex phrase structure rules and yielded an elegant account... ”) According to American linguist Frederick Newmeyer, this particular analysis won many "supporters for Chomsky" and "immediately led to some linguists' proposing generative-transformational analysis of particular phenomena". According to British linguist E. Keith Brown, "the elegance and insightfulness of this account was instantly recognized, and this was an important factor in ensuring the initial success of the transformational way of looking at syntax." American linguist Mark Aronoff wrote that this "beautiful analysis and description of some very striking facts was the rhetorical weapon that drove the acceptance of [Chomsky's] theory". He added that in Chomsky's treatment of English verbs, "the convergence of theory and analysis provide a description of facts so convincing that it changed the entire field".

Raymond Oenbring, a doctorate in the rhetoric of science, thinks that Chomsky "overstates the novelty" of transformational rules. He "seems to take all the credit for them" even though a version of them had already been introduced by Zellig Harris in a previous work. He writes that Chomsky himself was "cautious" to "display deference" to prevailing linguistic research. His enthusiastic followers such as Lees were, by contrast, much more "confrontational". They sought to drive a "rhetorical wedge" between Chomsky's work and that of post-Bloomfieldians (i.e. American linguists in the 1940s et 1950s), arguing that the latter does not qualify as linguistic "science".

== Reception ==
=== Impact on linguistics ===
In an early review of the book, American structural linguist Charles F. Voegelin wrote that Syntactic Structures posed a fundamental challenge to the established way of doing linguistic research. He stated that it had the potential to accomplish "a Copernican revolution" within linguistics. Another American linguist Martin Joos called the Chomskyan brand of linguistic theory a "heresy" within the Bloomfieldian tradition. These early remarks proved to be prescient. American linguist Paul Postal commented in 1964 that most of the "syntactic conceptions prevalent in the United States" were "versions of the theory of phrase structure grammars in the sense of Chomsky". By 1965, linguists were saying that Syntactic Structures had "mark[ed] an epoch", had a "startling impact" and created a Kuhnian "revolution". British linguist John Lyons wrote in 1966 that "no work has had a greater influence upon the current linguistic theory than Chomsky's Syntactic Structures." British historian of linguistics R. H. Robins wrote in 1967 that the publication of Chomsky's Syntactic Structures was "probably the most radical and important change in direction in descriptive linguistics and in linguistic theory that has taken place in recent years".

Another historian of linguistics Frederick Newmeyer considers Syntactic Structures "revolutionary" for two reasons. Firstly, it showed that a formal yet non-empiricist theory of language was possible. Chomsky demonstrated this possibility in a practical sense by formally treating a fragment of English grammar. Secondly, it put syntax at the center of the theory of language. Syntax was recognized as the focal point of language production, in which a finite set of rules can produce an infinite number of sentences. Subsequently, morphology (i.e. the study of structure and formation of words) and phonology (i.e. the study of organization of sounds in languages) were relegated in importance.

American linguist Norbert Hornstein wrote that before Syntactic Structures, linguistic research was overly preoccupied with creating hierarchies and categories of all observable language data. One of the "lasting contributions" of Syntactic Structures is that it shifted the linguistic research methodology to abstract, rationalist theory-making based on contacts with data, which is the "common scientific practice".

=== Impact on other disciplines ===
Psychology

The generative grammar of Syntactic Structures heralded Chomsky's mentalist perspective in linguistic analysis. Shortly after its publication, in 1959, Chomsky wrote a critical review of B.F. Skinner's Verbal Behavior. Skinner had presented the acquisition of human language in terms of conditioned responses to outside stimuli and reinforcement. Chomsky opposed this behaviorist model. He argued that humans produce language using separate syntactic and semantic components inside the mind. He presented the generative grammar as a coherent abstract description of this underlying psycholinguistic reality. Chomsky's argument had a forceful impact on psycholinguistic research. It changed the course of the discipline in the following years.

Philosophy

Syntactic Structures initiated an interdisciplinary dialog between philosophers of language and linguists. American philosopher John Searle called it a "remarkable intellectual achievement" of its time. He compared the book "to the work of Keynes or Freud". He credited it with producing not only a "revolution in linguistics", but also having a "revolutionary effect" on "philosophy and psychology". Chomsky and Willard Van Orman Quine, a stridently anti-mentalistic philosopher of language, debated many times on the merit of Chomsky's linguistic theories. Many philosophers supported Chomsky's idea that natural languages are innate and syntactically rule-governed. They also believed in the existence of rules in the human mind which bind meanings to utterances. The investigation of these rules started a new era in philosophical semantics. (Note: Stokhof 2012, p. 548 writes: "That natural languages are indeed not systematic enough to allow formal treatment ... is ... a complaint that has been leveled against natural languages by philosophers for centuries. The work of Chomsky in generative linguistics apparently inspired much more confidence in philosophers and logicians to assert that perhaps natural languages weren't as unsystematic and misleading as their philosophical predecessors had made them out to be ... at the end of 1960s formal semantics began to flourish.") (Note: Davidson 1967 writes: "Recent work by Chomsky and others is doing much to bring the complexities of natural languages within the scope of serious semantic theory".)

Computer science

With its formal and logical treatment of language, Syntactic Structures also brought linguistics and the new field of computer science closer together. Computer scientist Donald Knuth (winner of the Turing Award) recounted that he read Syntactic Structures in 1961 and was influenced by it. (Note: From the preface of Knuth 2003: "... researchers in linguistics were beginning to formulate rules of grammar that were considerably more mathematical than before. And people began to realize that such methods are highly relevant to the artificial languages that were becoming popular for computer programming, even though natural languages like English remained intractable. I found the mathematical approach to grammar immediately appealing—so much so, in fact, that I must admit to taking a copy of Noam Chomsky's Syntactic Structures along with me on my honeymoon in 1961. During odd moments, while crossing the Atlantic in an ocean liner and while camping in Europe, I read that book rather thoroughly and tried to answer some basic theoretical questions. Here was a marvelous thing: a mathematical theory of language in which I could use a computer programmer's intuition! The mathematical, linguistic, and algorithmic parts of my life had previously been totally separate. During the ensuing years those three aspects became steadily more intertwined; and by the end of the 1960s I found myself a Professor of Computer Science at Stanford University, primarily because of work that I had done with respect to languages for computer programming.") Chomsky's "Three models" paper (Chomsky 1956), published a year prior to the Syntactic Structures and containing many of its ideas, was crucial to the development of the theory of formal languages within computer science. (Note: Boden 2006, p. 648 writes:"[Papers like the "Three Models"] had a huge, lasting influence on pure computer science" and that they are cited in "virtually every introduction to compiler design". Hopcroft & Ullman 1979, p. 9 states that "Chomsky's notion of a context-free grammar ... has aided immensely the specification of programming languages.")

Neuroscience

In 2011, a group of French neuroscientists conducted research to verify if actual brain mechanisms worked in the way that Chomsky suggested in Syntactic Structures. The results suggested that specific regions of the brain handle syntactic information in an abstract way. These are independent from other brain regions that handle semantic information. Moreover, the brain analyzes not just mere strings of words, but hierarchical structures of constituents. These observations validated the theoretical claims of Chomsky in Syntactic Structures.

In 2015, neuroscientists at New York University conducted experiments to verify if the human brain uses "hierarchical structure building" for processing languages. They measured the magnetic and electric activities in the brains of participants. The results showed that "[human] brains distinctly tracked three components of the phrases they heard." This "[reflected] a hierarchy in our neural processing of linguistic structures: words, phrases, and then sentences—at the same time." These results bore out Chomsky's hypothesis in Syntactic Structures of an "internal grammar mechanism" inside the brain.

== Criticisms ==
Erroneous idealization

In his 1964 presidential address to the Linguistic Society of America, American linguist Charles Hockett considered Syntactic Structures one of "only four major breakthroughs in modern linguistics". (Note: The other three are Sir William Jones's address to the Asiatic Society in 1786, Karl Verner's Eine Ausnahme der ersten Lautverschiebung in 1875 and Ferdinand de Saussure's Cours de Linguistique Générale in 1916.) But he rapidly turned into a fierce critic of Chomskyan linguistics. By 1966, Hockett rejected "[Chomsky's] frame of reference in almost every detail". In his 1968 book The State of the Art, Hockett writes that Chomsky's main fallacy is that he treats language as a formal, well-defined, stable system and proceeds from this idealized abstraction. Hockett believes such an idealization is not possible. He claims that there is no empirical evidence that our language faculty is, in reality, a well-defined underlying system. The sources that give rise to language faculty in humans, e.g. physical genetic transmission and cultural transmission, are themselves poorly defined. (Note: Hockett 1968, p. 83 states: "we must not promote our more or less standardized by-and-large characterization of the language to the status of a monolithic ideal, nor infer that because we can achieve a fixed characterization some such monolithic ideal exists, in the lap of God or in the brain of each individual speaker.") Hockett also opposed Chomsky's hypothesis that syntax is completely independent of the study of meaning.

Non-empiricism

Contrary to Hockett, British linguist Geoffrey Sampson thought that Chomsky's assumptions about a well-defined grammaticality are "[justified] in practice." It brought syntax "within the purview of scientific description". He considers it a "great positive contribution to the discipline". However, he maintains that Chomsky's linguistics is overly "intuition-based". For him, it relies too much on native speakers' subjective introspective judgments about their own language. Consequently, language data empirically observed by impersonal third parties are given less importance.

Influence of The Logical Structure of Linguistic Theory

According to Sampson, Syntactic Structures largely owes its good fortune of becoming the dominant theoretical paradigm in the following years to the charisma of Chomsky's intellect. Sampson writes that there are many references in Syntactic Structures to Chomsky's own The Logical Structure of Linguistic Theory (LSLT) in matters regarding the formal underpinnings of Chomsky's approach, but LSLT was not widely available in print for decades. Nevertheless, Sampson's argument runs, Syntactic Structures, albeit "sketchy", derived its "aura of respectability" from LSLT lurking in the background. In turn, the acceptance of Chomsky's future works rested on the success of Syntactic Structures. In the view of British-American linguist Geoffrey K. Pullum, Syntactic Structures boldly claims that "it is impossible, not just difficult" for finite-state devices to generate all grammatical sentences of English, and then alludes to LSLT for the "rigorous proof" of this. But in reality, LSLT does not contain a valid, convincing proof dismissing finite-state devices.

Originality

Pullum also remarks that the "originality" of Syntactic Structures is "highly overstated". For him, it "does not properly credit the earlier literature on which it draws". He shows in detail how the approach in Syntactic Structures goes directly back to the work of the mathematical logician Emil Post on formalizing proof. But "few linguists are aware of this, because Post's papers are not cited." Pullum adds that the use of formal axiomatic systems to generate probable sentences in language in a top-down manner was first proposed by Zellig Harris in 1947, ten years before the publication of Syntactic Structures. This is downplayed in Syntactic Structures.

Necessity of transformations

In 1982, Pullum and another British linguist Gerald Gazdar argued that Chomsky's criticisms of context-free phrase structure grammar in Syntactic Structures are either mathematically flawed or based on incorrect assessments of the empirical data. They stated that a purely phrase structure treatment of grammar can explain linguistic phenomena better than one that uses transformations. (Note: Versions of such non-transformational phrase structure grammars include Generalized phrase structure grammar (GPSG), Head-driven phrase structure grammar (HPSG) and Lexical functional grammar (LFG).) Evidence soon emerged, however, that context-free grammars (CFGs) could not describe all of natural language (with examples in particular from Dutch and Swiss German cross-serial dependencies), and Gazdar, along with most other syntacticians, accepted that natural languages cannot in fact be adequately described by CFGs. This led to the emergence of the mildly context-sensitive grammar formalism, that is equivalent to Minimalist grammars stemming from later Chomsky's works.

== Honors ==
In 2000, University of Minnesota's Center for Cognitive Sciences compiled a list of the 100 most influential works in cognitive science from the 20th century. In total, 305 scholarly works and one movie were nominated via the internet. Syntactic Structures was ranked number one on this list, marking it as the most influential work of cognitive science of the century. (Note: See the list of the 100 most influential works in cognitive science from the 20th century online here: https://web.archive.org/web/20040821111702/http://www.cogsci.umn.edu/OLD/calendar/past_events/millennium/final.html)

Syntactic Structures was included in The 100 Most Influential Books Ever Written, a book on intellectual history by British literary critic and biographer Martin Seymour-Smith published in 1998.

Syntactic Structures was also featured in a list of 100 best English language non-fiction books since 1923 picked by the American weekly magazine Time.

== Works cited ==
- Aronoff, Mark (2014), "Face the facts : Reading Chomsky's 'Remarks on Nominalization' after forty years", in Florence Villoing; Sophie David (eds.), Foisonnements morphologiques: études en hommage à Françoise Kerleroux, Paris: Presses Universitaires de Paris Ouest, pp. 307–324, archived from the original on 2016-06-09
- Bach, Emmon (1965), "Structural Linguistics and the Philosophy of Science", Diogenes, 13 (51): 111–128, doi:10.1177/039219216501305107, S2CID 145793812
- Bar-Hillel, Yehoshua (1953), "A Quasi-Arithmetical Notation for Syntactic Description", Language, 29 (1): 47–58, doi:10.2307/410452, JSTOR 410452
- Barsky, Robert (1997), Noam Chomsky: A life of Dissent, Cambridge, Massachusetts: The MIT Press, ISBN 978-0-262-52255-7, archived from the original on 2006-09-06
- Barsky, Robert (2011), The Chomsky Effect: A Radical works beyond the Ivory Tower, Cambridge, Massachusetts: The MIT Press, ISBN 978-0-262-51316-6, archived from the original on 2006-09-06
- Boden, Margaret (2006), Mind as Machine: A History of Cognitive Science, Oxford: Oxford University Press, ISBN 978-0-19-924144-6
- Brown, E. Keith (2010), "Generative Grammar", in Kirsten Malmkjaer (ed.), The Routledge Linguistics Encyclopedia (3 ed.), London & New York: Routledge
- Bugarski, Ranko (1972), Gramatica i um (in Serbo-Croatian), Belgrade: Nolit
- Carnap, Rudolf (1934), Logische Syntax der Sprache, Wien (Vienna): Julius Springer, ISBN 978-3-662-23330-6
- Chomsky, Noam (1949), Morphophonemics of Modern Hebrew (B.A. thesis), University of Pennsylvania
- Chomsky, Noam (1951), Morphophonemics of Modern Hebrew (M.A. thesis), University of Pennsylvania
- Chomsky, Noam (1953), "Systems of Syntactic Analysis", Journal of Symbolic Logic, 18 (3): 242–256, doi:10.2307/2267409, JSTOR 2267409, S2CID 11796020
- Chomsky, Noam (1956), "Three models for the description of language" (PDF), IRE Transactions on Information Theory, 2 (3): 113–124, Bibcode:1956IRTIT...2..113C, doi:10.1109/TIT.1956.1056813, S2CID 19519474
- Chomsky, Noam (1957), Syntactic Structures, The Hague/Paris: Mouton, ISBN 978-3-11-021832-9
- Chomsky, Noam (1959), "A Review of B. F. Skinner's Verbal Behavior", Language, 35 (1): 26–58, doi:10.2307/411334, JSTOR 411334
- Chomsky, Noam (1962), "Синтакси́ческие структу́ры (Sintaksychyeskiye Struktury)", in Vladimir Andreevich Zveginchev (ed.), Novoe v lingvistike (in Russian), vol. 2, translated by Babisky, Konstantin Ivanovich, Moscow: Izd-vo Inostr. Literatury, pp. 412–527
- Chomsky, Noam (1963), 文法の構造 (Bunpō no kōzō) (in Japanese), translated by Isamu, Yasuo, Tokyo: Kenkyusha
- Chomsky, Noam (1964), Current issues in linguistic theory, The Hague: Mouton, ISBN 978-90-279-0700-4
- Chomsky, Noam (1965), Aspects of the Theory of Syntax, Cambridge, Massachusetts: MIT Press, ISBN 978-0-262-52740-8
- Chomsky, Noam (1966a), Syntaktické struktury : logický základ teorie jazyka, O pojmu "gramatické pravidlo." (in Czech), translated by Hlavsa, Zdeněk; Benešová, Eva; Daneš, František, Prague: Academia
- Chomsky, Noam (1966b), 변형생성문법의_이론 (Byeonhyeongsaengseongmunbeobui_iron) (in Korean), translated by Lee, Seung-Hwan; Lee, Hei-Sook, Seoul: Pan-Korea Book Corporation
- Chomsky, Noam (1969), Structures Syntaxiques (in French), translated by Braudeau, Michel, Paris: Éditions du Seuil
- Chomsky, Noam (1970), Le strutture della sintassi, Universale Laterza (in Italian), vol. 129, translated by Antinucci, Francesco, Bari: Laterza
- Chomsky, Noam (1973a), Strukturen der Syntax (in German), translated by Lange, Klaus-Peter, The Hague: Mouton
- Chomsky, Noam (1973b), Syntaktiska Strukturer (in Swedish), translated by Löfqvist, Anders; Wigforss, Eva, Lund: Gleerup
- Chomsky, Noam (1974), Estructuras sintácticas (in Spanish), translated by Otero, Carlos Peregrín, Mexico City, Mexico: Siglo XXI, ISBN 978-968-23-0075-2
- Chomsky, Noam (1975), The Logical Structure of Linguistic Theory, New York: Plenum, ISBN 978-0-306-30760-7
- Chomsky, Noam (1978), "A theory of core grammar", Glot (1): 7–26
- Chomsky, Noam (1979), Language and Responsibility, New York: Pantheon, ISBN 978-0-85527-535-8
- Chomsky, Noam; Halle, Morris; Lukoff, Fred (1956), "On Accent and Juncture in English", in M. Halle; H.G. Lunt; H. McLean; C.H. van Schooneveld (eds.), For Roman Jakobson: Essays on the occasion of his sixtieth birthday, The Hague: Mouton & Co., pp. 65–80, ISBN 9780598664198
- Collins, John (2008), Chomsky: A Guide for the Perplexed, Guides for the Perplexed, London and New York: Bloomsbury Academic, ISBN 978-0-8264-8663-9
- Cook, Vivian (2007), "Chomsky's Syntactic Structures fifty years on", International Journal of Applied Linguistics, 17 (1): 120–131, doi:10.1111/j.1473-4192.2007.00137.x
- Davidson, Donald (1967), "Truth and Meaning", Synthese, 17: 304–23, doi:10.1007/bf00485035, S2CID 14720789
- Dillinger, Mike; Palácio, Adair (1997), "Lingüística gerativa: Desenvolvimento e Perspectivas uma Entrevista com Noam Chomsky", DELTA: Documentação de Estudos em Lingüística Teórica e Aplicada (in Portuguese), 13: 199–235, doi:10.1590/S0102-44501997000300007
- Goldsmith, John A.; Huck, Geoffrey J. (1995), Ideology and Linguistic Theory: Noam Chomsky and the Deep Structure Debates, History of Linguistic Thought, London and New York: Routledge, ISBN 978-0-415-15313-3
- Graffi, Giorgio (2001), 200 Years of Syntax: A Critical Survey, Studies in the History of the Language Sciences, John Benjamins Publishing, ISBN 978-1588110527
- Hamans, Camiel (2014), "The coming about of Syntactic Structures", Beiträge zur Geschichte der Sprachwissenschaft, 24 (1): 133–156
- Harris, Randy Allen (1989), "Argumentation in Chomsky's syntactic structures: An exercise in rhetoric of science", Rhetoric Society Quarterly, 19 (2): 105–130, doi:10.1080/02773948909390840
- Harris, Randy Allen (1993), The Linguistics Wars, New York: Oxford University Press, ISBN 9780195098341
- Harris, Zellig (1951), Methods in Structural Linguistics, Chicago: University of Chicago Press
- Heitner, R. M. (2005), "An odd couple: Chomsky and Quine on the phoneme", Language Sciences, 27: 1–30, doi:10.1016/j.langsci.2003.11.006
- Hinrichs, Jan Paul (2001), The C. H. van Schooneveld Collection in Leiden University Library. Editorial correspondence and documents relating to Mouton & Co., The Hague, and other papers in the fields of Slavistics and linguistics, Leiden: Leiden University Library, ISBN 978-90-74204-10-1
- Hockett, Charles (1965), "Sound Change", Language, 41 (2): 185–204, doi:10.2307/411873, JSTOR 411873.
- Hockett, Charles (1966), "Language, mathematics and linguistics", Current Trends in Linguistics, vol. 3. Theoretical Foundations, The Hague: Mouton, pp. 155–304
- Hockett, Charles (1968), The State of the Art, The Hague: Mouton
- Hopcroft, John E.; Ullman, Jeffrey D. (1979), Introduction to Automata Theory, Languages, and Computation (1st ed.), Addison-Wesley, ISBN 978-81-7808-347-6
- Jakobson, Romam; Halle, Morris (1956), Fundamentals of Language, The Hague: Mouton, ISBN 978-1-178-71814-0
- Joos, Martin (1961), "Linguistic prospects in the US", in Christine Mohrmann; et al. (eds.), Trends in European and American Linguistics, Utrecht: Spectrum, pp. 11–20
- Joseph, John E. (2001), "The exportation of structuralist ideas from linguistics to other ideas: An overview", in S. Auroux; et al. (eds.), History of the Language Sciences, Walter De Gruyter, pp. 1880–1908
- Joseph, John E. (2002). From Whitney to Chomsky: Essays in the History of American Linguistics. John Benjamins. ISBN 9789027275370.
- Joseph, John E.; Love, Nigel; Taylor, Talbot J. (2001), Landmarks in Linguistic Thought II: The Western Tradition in the Twentieth Century, History of Linguistic Thought, London and New York: Routledge, ISBN 9780415063968
- Douglas A. Kibbee, ed. (2010), Chomskyan (R)evolutions, Amsterdam and Philadelphia: John Benjamins Publishing Company
- Knuth, Donald (2003), Selected Papers on Computer Languages, CSLI Lecture Notes, Stanford, California: Center for the Study of Language and Information, archived from the original on 2018-08-20
- Koerner, E. F. K. (2002), Towards a history of American linguistics, Routledge Studies in the History of Linguistics 5, London & New York: Routledge Taylor & Francis Group, ISBN 9781134495085
- Lees, Robert (1957), "Review of Syntactic Structures" (PDF), Language, 33 (3): 375–408, doi:10.2307/411160, JSTOR 411160, archived from the original (PDF) on 2013-11-26.
- Levin, Samuel R. (1965), "Langue and Parole in American Linguistics", Foundations of Language, 1: 83–94
- Lyons, John (1966), "Review of Aspects of the Theory of Syntax by Noam Chomsky", The Philosophical Quarterly, 16 (65): 393–395, doi:10.2307/2218520, JSTOR 2218520.
- McGilvray, James (2005), The Cambridge Companion to Chomsky, Cambridge, United Kingdom: Cambridge University Press, ISBN 9780521784313
- Newmeyer, Frederick J. (1986), "Has There Been a 'Chomskyan Revolution' in Linguistics?", Language, 62 (1): 1–18, doi:10.2307/415597, JSTOR 415597
- Newmeyer, Frederick J. (1996), Generative Linguistics: A Historical Perspective, Routledge history of linguistic thought series, Routledge, ISBN 978-0-415-11553-7
- Newmeyer, Frederick J. (1987), Linguistic Theory in America (2 ed.), San Diego, California: Academic Press, ISBN 978-0125171519
- Noordegraaf, Jan (2001), "On the publication date of Syntactic Structures: A footnote to Murray 1999" (PDF), Historiographia Linguistica, 28 (1–2): 225–228, doi:10.1075/hl.28.1-2.18noo (inactive 28 January 2026)
- Oenbring, Raymond (2009), Scientific rhetoric and disciplinary identity: A critical rhetorical history of generative grammar (Ph.D. thesis), University of Washington
- Otero, Carlos Peregrín (1994), Noam Chomsky: Critical Assessments, vol. 2, London and New York: Routledge Press
- Pallier, Christophe; Devauchelle, Anne-Dominique; Dehaene, Stanislas (2011), "Cortical representation of the constituent structure of sentences", Proceedings of the National Academy of Sciences, 108 (6): 2522–2527, doi:10.1073/pnas.1018711108, PMC 3038732, PMID 21224415
- Post, Emil Leon (1943), "Formal Reductions of the General Combinatorial Decision Problem", American Journal of Mathematics, 65 (2): 197–215, doi:10.2307/2371809, JSTOR 2371809
- Post, Emil Leon (1944), "Recursively enumerable sets of positive integers and their decision problems", Bulletin of the American Mathematical Society, 50 (5): 284–316, doi:10.1090/s0002-9904-1944-08111-1
- Postal, Paul M. (1964), Constituent Structure: A Study of Contemporary Models of Syntactic Description, Bloomington, Indiana: Indiana University
- Pullum, Geoffrey K.; Gazdar, Gerald (1982), "Natural languages and context-free languages" (PDF), Linguistics and Philosophy, 4 (4): 471–504, doi:10.1007/bf00360802, S2CID 189881482, archived from the original (PDF) on 2019-11-01
- Pullum, Geoffrey K.; Scholz, Barbara C. (2001), "On the distinction between model-theoretic and generative-enumerative syntactic frameworks", in Philippe de Groote; Glyn Morrill; Christian Retore (eds.), Logical Aspects of Computational Linguistics: 4th International Conference, Lecture Notes in Artificial Intelligence, Berlin: Springer Verlag, pp. 17–43
- Pullum, Geoffrey K. (2010), "Creation Myths of Generative Grammar and the Mathematics of Syntactic Structures" (PDF), The Mathematics of Language, Lecture Notes in Computer Science, vol. 6149, Berlin Heidelberg: Springer Berlin Heidelberg, pp. 238–254, doi:10.1007/978-3-642-14322-9_18, ISBN 978-3-642-14321-2
- Pullum, Geoffrey K. (2011), "On the Mathematical Foundations of Syntactic Structures" (PDF), Journal of Logic, Language and Information, 20 (3): 277–296, doi:10.1007/s10849-011-9139-8, hdl:20.500.11820/3bfafa09-b7f2-4249-b2d3-714227f2ddb8, S2CID 26842058
- Quine, Willard Van Orman (1951), "Two Dogmas of Empiricism", Philosophical Review, 60 (1): 20–43, doi:10.2307/2181906, JSTOR 2181906
- Quine, Willard Van Orman (1969), "Reply to Chomsky", in D. Davidson and J. Hintikka (ed.), Words and Objections, Dordrecht: D. Reidel
- Rebuschi, Georges (2001), "La grammaire generative du milieu des annees 70 au milieu des annees 90: du modele Standard etendu aux debuts du programme minimaliste", in S. Auroux; et al. (eds.), History of the Language Sciences, Walter De Gruyter, pp. 2084–2110
- Riemsdijk, Henk C. van.; Huybregts, Riny (1982), The Generative Enterprise: A Discussion, Dordrecht, Holland: Foris Publications
- Robins, R. H. (1967), A Short History of Linguistics, London: Longman, ISBN 9781317891116
- Sampson, Geoffrey (1980), Schools of Linguistics, London: Hutchinson & Co
- Sampson, Geoffrey (2001), Empirical Linguistics, London and New York: Continuum International
- Searle, John R. (1972), "Chomsky's Revolution in Linguistics", The New York Review of Books, 18 (12)
- Searle, John R. (2002), "End of the Revolution", The New York Review of Books, 49 (3): 33–6
- Seymour-Smith, Martin (1998), The 100 most influential books ever written : the history of thought from ancient times to today, Secaucus, N.J.: Carol Publ. Group, ISBN 978-0-8065-2000-1, OCLC 38258131
- Shannon, Claude E.; Weaver, Warren (1949), The Mathematical Theory of Communication, Urbana: University of Illinois Press, hdl:11858/00-001M-0000-002C-4314-2, ISBN 978-0-252-72548-7
- Skinner, Burrhus Frederick (1957), Verbal Behavior, Acton, MA: Copley Publishing Group, ISBN 978-1-58390-021-5
- Sklar, Robert (9 September 1968), "Chomsky's Revolution in Linguistics", The Nation: 213–217
- Steinberg, Danny D.; Hiroshi, Nagata; Aline, David P. (2013), Psycholinguistics: Language, Mind and World, Routledge, ISBN 9781317900566
- Stokhof, Martin (2012), "The Role of Artificial Languages in the Philosophy of Language", in Gillian Russell and Delia Graff Fara (ed.), The Routledge Companion to Philosophy of Language, Routledge Philosophy Companions, Routledge
- Thomas, Margaret (2012), Fifty Key Thinkers on Language and Linguistics, Routledge, ISBN 9781136707506
- Thorne, James Peter (1965), "Review of P. Postal, Constituent Structure", Journal of Linguistics, 1: 73–6, doi:10.1017/s0022226700001055, S2CID 144201727
- Tomalin, Marcus (2002), "The formal origins of syntactic theory", Lingua, 112 (10): 827–848, doi:10.1016/S0024-3841(02)00049-9
- Tomalin, Marcus (2003), "Goodman, Quine, and Chomsky: from a grammatical point of view", Lingua, 113 (12): 1223–1253, CiteSeerX 10.1.1.136.6985, doi:10.1016/s0024-3841(03)00017-2
- Tomalin, Marcus (2006), Linguistics and the Formal Sciences: The Origins of Generative Grammar, Cambridge: Cambridge University Press, ISBN 9780511486340
- van Schooneveld, Cornelis H. (2001), "A brief comment re Jan Noordegraaf's "On the publication date of Syntactic Structures"", Historiographia Linguistica, 28 (3): 468, doi:10.1075/hl.28.3.19sch
- Voegelin, Charles F (1958), "Review of Noam Chomsky, Syntactic Structures", International Journal of American Linguistics, 24 (3): 229–231, doi:10.1086/464460
