= Minimal recursion semantics =

Theoretical framework in linguistics

Minimal recursion semantics (MRS) is a framework for computational semantics. It can be implemented in typed feature structure formalisms such as head-driven phrase structure grammar and lexical functional grammar. It is suitable for computational language parsing and natural language generation. MRS enables a simple formulation of the grammatical constraints on lexical and phrasal semantics, including the principles of semantic composition. This technique is used in machine translation.

Early pioneers of MRS include Ann Copestake, Dan Flickinger, Carl Pollard, and Ivan Sag.

== See also ==
- DELPH-IN
- Discourse representation theory
