= Lectures on Government and Binding =

1981 book by Noam Chomsky

Lectures on Government and Binding: The Pisa Lectures
- First edition
- Author: Noam Chomsky
- Language: English
- Series: Studies in Generative Grammar
- Subject: Natural language syntax
- Publisher: Foris Publications
- Publication date: 1981
- Pages: 371

Lectures on Government and Binding: The Pisa Lectures (LGB) is a book by the linguist Noam Chomsky, published in 1981. It is based on the lectures Chomsky gave at the GLOW conference and workshop held at the Scuola Normale Superiore in Pisa, Italy, in 1979. In this book, Chomsky presented his government and binding theory of syntax. It had great influence on the syntactic research in early 1980s, especially among the linguists working within the transformational grammar framework.

== Background ==
From its inception in the 1950s, the Chomskyan brand of linguistics has been concerned with a person's knowledge of language, the unconscious mental knowledge that makes him a native speaker of some language. This innate, unobservable knowledge of language is called the speaker's linguistic competence, whereas his outward linguistic behavior which provides the linguist with observable data is called his linguistic performance. Generative grammar tries to provide an adequate model of linguistic competence. When such a grammar can generate (i.e. provide an explicit structural description for) all the grammatical (i.e. syntactically well-formed) sentences of a language and successfully detect all the ungrammatical sentences, it is called observationally adequate. But this kind of adequacy does not provide a sufficiently adequate model of linguistic competence. If the grammar can systematically and accurately describe the adult speaker's linguistic competence, it is called descriptively adequate. If a grammar can describe the acquisition of this linguistic competence in a human child from its initial state to the final state, then it is said to have explanatory adequacy. In Government and Binding theory, Chomsky is interested in the initial state of linguistic competence in a child, which is called a human's biological endowment for language. Since every normal human child is capable of acquiring any language, this endowment is also called by the name of universal grammar.

With his book Syntactic Structures (1957), Chomsky established the concept of transformational generative grammar (TGG), a formal approach to linguistic theorizing, and revolutionized the discipline of linguistics. In Aspects of the Theory of Syntax (1965), the TGG model went through a revision, which included the inclusion of a lexical component, the separation of deep from surface structures, and the introduction of some technical innovations such as syntactic features and recursive phrase structure rules. This Aspects model came to be known as the "Standard Theory". During the early 1970s, some of the rules in the Standard Theory got refined and led to the "Extended Standard Theory", where different syntactic levels contained information relevant to the meaning. Further revisions and technical innovations such as introduction of "empty categories", "X-bar theory", "D- and S-structures", and conditions on representations such as "Case filter", etc. led to the "Revised Extended Standard Theory", in which the grammatical model was greatly simplified. Lectures on Government and Binding contains the next step in Chomskyan linguistic thought where Universal Grammar and the investigation of its characteristics assume central importance.

== Universal grammar—principles and parameters ==
In LGB, Chomsky hypothesizes the following: universal grammar (UG) is the essential set of linguistic universals that every human child is born with. The UG contains a number of fixed "principles" that are true for all languages. Also embedded in the UG are flexible "parameters" that have to be fixed by experience. As the human child gains linguistic experience, its brain uses the limited linguistic evidence (see Poverty of the stimulus) at its disposal to fix the parameters of UG and give rise to, in a non-inductive manner, the core grammar of the child's first language.
