= Mary Dalrymple =

British linguist

Mary Dalrymple FBA (born 9 March 1954) is a British linguist who is professor of syntax at Oxford University. At Oxford, she is a fellow of Linacre College. Prior to that she was a lecturer in linguistics at King's College London, a senior member of the research staff at the Palo Alto Research Center (formerly the Xerox Palo Alto Research Center) in the Natural Language Theory and Technology group and a computer scientist at SRI International.

== Early life and education ==
She received her PhD in linguistics from Stanford University in 1990. Her master's degree and bachelor's degree are from the University of Texas, Austin and Cornell College, respectively.

== Career ==
Dalrymple has also been associated with CSLI (Center for the Study of Language and Information) as a researcher. Her research focus is on linguistics and computational linguistics and centers mainly on grammar development, syntax, semantics and the syntax-semantics interface. She has worked on a broad range of languages, including English, Hindi, Marathi, Malagasy and Indonesian. She is one of the prime architects of Glue Semantics and works primarily within Lexical Functional Grammar (LFG), a linguistic theory for which she has written a textbook Lexical Functional Grammar and to which she has contributed a theory of anaphoric binding. Her most recent major work has dealt with the relationship between case marking, information structure (topic, focus) and semantics.

== Honors and awards ==
Dalrymple was inducted as a fellow of the British Academy in 2013. She was elected as a member of the Academia Europaea in 2018.

== Selected publications ==
- Dalrymple, Mary; Kaplan, Ronald M. (2000). "Feature Indeterminacy and Feature Resolution". Language. 76 (4): 759–798. doi:10.2307/417199. JSTOR 417199.
- Dalrymple, Mary; Nikolaeva, Irina (2006). "Syntax of natural and accidental coordination: Evidence from agreement". Language. 82 (4): 824–849. doi:10.1353/lan.2006.0189.
- Dalrymple, Mary; Kaplan, Ronald M.; King, Tracy Holloway (2008). "The Absence of Traces: Evidence from Weak Crossover". In Zaenen, Annie Else (ed.). Architectures, Rules, and Preferences: Variations on Themes. CSLI Publications. pp. 85–102.
- Dalrymple, Mary; King, Tracy Holloway; Sadler, Louisa (January 28, 2009). "Indeterminacy by underspecification" (PDF). Journal of Linguistics. 45 (1). Cambridge University Press: 31–68. doi:10.1017/s0022226708005513. ISSN 0022-2267. S2CID 15689306.
- Dalrymple, M. (2023). The Handbook of Lexical Functional Grammar. Berlin: Language Science Press. doi:10.5281/zenodo.10037797. ISBN 978-3961104246.
