= PATR-II =

PATR-II is a linguistic formalism used in computational linguistics, developed by Stuart M. Shieber. It uses context-free grammar rules and feature constraints on these rules.

== See also ==
- Head-driven phrase structure grammar
