= Underlying representation =

Hypothesis of phonological analysis

In phonology and morphophonology, an underlying representation (UR) or underlying form (UF) is a hypothesized, abstract representation of a morpheme or word stored in the lexicon and used as the input to phonological analysis. The output of phonological analysis is commonly described as a surface representation (SR), which reflects the effects of phonological processes and may differ systematically from an underlying form. Underlying representations are used to express generalizations about alternations, including cases where a single morpheme has different surface pronunciations in different environments or within a paradigm.

== Background ==
=== Role in analysis ===
Analyses that posit underlying representations typically separate information that is treated as lexically stored from information that is treated as predictable by the phonology. In many cases, a UR is similar to a phonemic transcription, but some approaches represent morphemes more abstractly (for example as feature-based representations, or with underspecification of predictable properties). Different frameworks use different mechanisms to relate underlying and surface forms (for example, ordered rules in rule-based approaches or ranked constraints in constraint-based approaches), but the term underlying representation generally refers to the lexical input to the phonological component in such analyses.

=== Evidence and inference ===
Underlying representations are not directly observable and are inferred from systematic patterns in surface forms. Common types of evidence include alternations across related forms (e.g., within inflectional paradigms), the distribution of segments and features across contexts, and cases of neutralization where an underlying contrast is not maintained in a particular environment but reappears elsewhere.

== Notation ==
A common convention is to use slashes for more abstract or lexical-level representations (including URs) and square brackets for phonetic detail, though conventions vary across authors and traditions. Some traditions also use other delimiters (for example, vertical bars) to distinguish different levels of abstraction in analysis.

== Examples ==
=== Allophony ===
In many varieties of American English, the phoneme /t/ may be realized as an unreleased stop [t̚] word-finally (wet [wɛt̚]) but as an alveolar tap [ɾ] in contexts such as between vowels when the following syllable is unstressed (wetter [ˈwɛɾɚ]). Textbook analyses often treat these as surface realizations derived from an underlying /t/, for example in the related forms /wɛt/ and /wɛt+ɚ/ (where the tap results from a context-dependent phonological process).

=== English plural suffix ===
English plural formation shows systematic alternations that are often analyzed with a single underlying plural morpheme (frequently transcribed /-z/) plus regular phonological processes (such as voicing assimilation or vowel insertion) that determine its surface realization in context.

Stem	UR (stem + PL)	Surface form
cat	/kæt+z/	[kæts]
dog	/dɔɡ+z/	[dɔɡz]
bus	/bʌs+z/	[bʌsɪz]

Introductory descriptions also commonly present the surface outcomes as three contextually selected allomorphs ([-s], [-z], [-ɪz]).

=== Neutralization ===
Underlying representations are often invoked in cases of neutralization, where a contrast is not realized in some environment but is preserved elsewhere. For example, in languages with final devoicing, a word-final obstruent may surface voiceless while related forms show a voiced consonant; analyses may posit a voiced consonant in the UR and derive the voiceless surface form in the neutralizing context.

=== Tone sandhi ===
Underlying representations are also used in the analysis of tonal alternations. A well-known case is Standard Chinese (Mandarin) third-tone sandhi, where a third tone changes its surface realization before another third tone; analyses commonly treat this as a context-dependent mapping from an underlying tonal specification to a different surface output.

== See also ==
- Allomorphy
- Allophone
- Morphophonology
- Phonological rule
- Underspecification
- Sandhi
