= Generalized phrase structure grammar =

Generalized phrase structure grammar (GPSG) is a framework for describing the syntax and semantics of natural languages. It is a type of constraint-based phrase structure grammar. Constraint based grammars are based around defining certain syntactic processes as ungrammatical for a given language and assuming everything not thus dismissed is grammatical within that language. Phrase structure grammars base their framework on constituency relationships, seeing the words in a sentence as ranked, with some words dominating the others. For example, in the sentence "The dog runs", "runs" is seen as dominating "dog" since it is the main focus of the sentence. This view stands in contrast to dependency grammars, which base their assumed structure on the relationship between a single word in a sentence (the sentence head) and its dependents.

== Origins ==
GPSG was initially developed in the late 1970s by Gerald Gazdar. Other contributors include Ewan Klein, Ivan Sag, and Geoffrey Pullum. Their book Generalized Phrase Structure Grammar, published in 1985, is the main monograph on GPSG, especially as it applies to English syntax. GPSG was in part a reaction against transformational theories of syntax. In fact, the notational extensions to context-free grammars (CFGs) developed in GPSG are claimed to make transformations redundant.

== Goals ==
One of the chief goals of GPSG is to show that the syntax of natural languages can be described by CFGs (written as ID/LP grammars), with some suitable conventions intended to make writing such grammars easier for syntacticians. Among these conventions are a sophisticated feature structure system and so-called "meta-rules", which are rules generating the productions of a context-free grammar. GPSG further augments syntactic descriptions with semantic annotations that can be used to compute the compositional meaning of a sentence from its syntactic derivation tree. However, it has been argued (for example by Robert Berwick) that these extensions require parsing algorithms of a higher order of computational complexity than those used for basic CFGs.

== Methodology ==
There are several ways to represent a sentence in Generalized Phrase Structure Grammar. One such method is a Syntax tree, which represents all of the words in a sentence as leaf nodes in a parsing tree, as can be seen in the provided image. However, there are several other ways of representing sentences in GPSG. Certain constituents can be illustrated without drawing a full tree by placing the constituent in question inside of brackets like so:

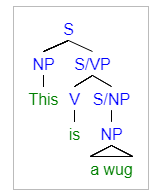
This file provides a simple example of a syntax tree that fits the Generalized Phrase Structure Grammar Framework.

Who did you say that [[Hilary was fond of ] and [Leslie despised ]].

== Counterarguments ==
Evidence soon emerged, however, that CFGs could not describe all of natural language (with examples in particular from Dutch and Swiss German cross-serial dependencies), and Gazdar, along with most other syntacticians, accepted that natural languages cannot in fact be adequately described by CFGs. As a result, Generalized Phrase Structure Grammar was soon abandoned as a framework for describing natural languages, although CFGs are still used in computing languages. Most of the syntactic innovations of GPSG were subsequently incorporated into head-driven phrase structure grammar.

== See also ==
- Lexical functional grammar
- Phrase structure grammar
- Transformational grammar
- Head-driven phrase structure grammar
