= Glue semantics =

Syntax-semantics interface

Glue semantics, or simply Glue (Dalrymple et al. 1993; Dalrymple 1999, 2001), is a linguistic theory of semantic composition and the syntax–semantics interface which assumes that meaning composition is constrained by a set of instructions stated within a formal logic (linear logic). These instructions, called meaning constructors, state how the meanings of the parts of a sentence can be combined to provide the meaning of the sentence.

== Overview ==
Glue was developed as a theory of the syntax–semantics interface within the linguistic theory of lexical functional grammar, and most work within Glue has been conducted within that framework. LFG/Glue assumes that the syntactic structure that is most relevant for meaning assembly is the functional structure, a structure which represents abstract syntactic predicate argument structure and relations like subject and object. In this setting, a meaning constructor for an intransitive verb states that the verb combines with the meaning of its subject to produce a meaning for the sentence. This is similar in some respects to the view of the syntax-semantics interface assumed within categorial grammar, except that abstract syntactic relations like subject and object rather than relations such as to-the-left-of are involved in meaningful constructor specifications. Glue analyses within other syntactic formalisms have also been proposed; besides LFG, glue analyses have been proposed within HPSG, context-free grammar, categorial grammar, tree-adjoining grammar, Minimalism, and Dependency Grammar.

Glue is a theory of the syntax–semantics interface which is compatible not only with various syntactic frameworks, but also with different theories of semantics and meaning representation. Semantic formalisms that have been used as the meaning languages in glue semantics analyses include versions of discourse representation theory, intensional logic, first-order logic, and natural semantic metalanguage.

== See also ==
- Lexical functional grammar
