= Aspects of the Theory of Syntax =

1965 book by Noam Chomsky

- Cover of the first edition
- Author: Noam Chomsky
- Language: English
- Subject: Natural language syntax
- Publisher: MIT Press
- Publication date: May 1965
- Media type: Print
- Pages: 261

Aspects of the Theory of Syntax (known in linguistic circles simply as Aspects) is a book on linguistics written by American linguist Noam Chomsky, first published in 1965. In Aspects, Chomsky presented a deeper, more extensive reformulation of transformational generative grammar (TGG), a new kind of syntactic theory that he had introduced in the 1950s with the publication of his first book, Syntactic Structures. Aspects is widely considered to be the foundational document and a proper book-length articulation of Chomskyan theoretical framework of linguistics. It presented Chomsky's epistemological assumptions with a view to establishing linguistic theory-making as a formal (i.e. based on the manipulation of symbols and rules) discipline comparable to physical sciences, i.e. a domain of inquiry well-defined in its nature and scope. From a philosophical perspective, it directed mainstream linguistic research away from behaviorism, constructivism, empiricism and structuralism and towards mentalism, nativism, rationalism and generativism, respectively, taking as its main object of study the abstract, inner workings of the human mind related to language acquisition and production.

== Background ==
After the publication of Chomsky's Syntactic Structures, the nature of linguistic research began to change, especially at MIT and elsewhere in the linguistic community where TGG had a favorable reception. Morris Halle, a student of Roman Jacobson and a colleague of Chomsky at MIT's Research Laboratory of Electronics (RLE), was a strong supporter of Chomsky's ideas of TGG. At first Halle worked on a generative phonology of Russian and published his work in 1959. From 1956 until 1968, together with Chomsky (and also with Fred Lukoff initially), Halle developed a new theory of phonology called generative phonology. Their collaboration culminated with the publication of The Sound Pattern of English in 1968. Robert Lees, a linguist of the traditional structuralist school, went to MIT in 1956 to work in the mechanical translation project at RLE, but became convinced by Chomsky's TGG approach and went on to publish, in 1960, probably the very first book of a linguistic analysis based on TGG entitled The Grammar of English Nominalizations. This work was preceded by Lees's doctoral thesis on the same topic, for which he was given a Ph.D. in electrical engineering. Lees was technically the first student of the new TGG paradigm. Edward S. Klima, a graduate of the Masters program from Harvard and hired by Chomsky at RLE in 1957, produced pioneering TGG-based work on negation. In 1959, Chomsky wrote a critical review of B. F. Skinner's Verbal Behavior (1957) in the journal Language, in which he emphasized on the fundamentally human characteristic of verbal creativity, which is present even in very young children, and rejected the behaviorist way of describing language in ambiguous terms such as "stimulus", "response", "habit", "conditioning", and "reinforcement".

With Morris Halle and others, Chomsky founded the graduate program in linguistics at MIT in 1961. The program immediately attracted some of the brightest young American linguists. Jerry Fodor and Jerrold Katz, both graduates of the Ph.D. program at Princeton, and Paul Postal, a Ph.D. from Yale, were some of the first students of this program. They made major contributions to the nascent field of TGG. John Viertel, a colleague of Chomsky at RLE in the 1950s, began working for a Ph.D. dissertation under Chomsky on the linguistic thoughts of Wilhelm von Humboldt, a nineteenth-century German linguist. Viertel's English translations of Humboldt's works influenced Chomsky at this time and made him abandon Saussurian views of linguistics. Chomsky also collaborated with visiting French mathematician Marcel-Paul Schützenberger, and was able to formulate one of the most important theorems of formal linguistics, the Chomsky-Schützenberger hierarchy. Within the theoretical framework of TGG, G. H. Matthews, Chomsky's colleague at RLE, worked on the grammar of Hidatsa, a Native American language. J. R. Applegate worked on the German noun phrase. Lees and Klima looked into English pronominalization. Matthews and Lees worked on the German verb phrase. On the nature of the linguistic research at MIT in those days, Jerry Fodor recalls that "...communication was very lively, and I guess we shared a general picture of the methodology for doing, not just linguistics, but behavioral science research. We were all more or less nativist, and all more or less mentalist. There was a lot of methodological conversation that one didn't need to have. One could get right to the substantive issues. So, from that point of view, it was extremely exciting." In 1962, Chomsky gave a paper at the Ninth International Congress of Linguists entitled "The Logical Basis of Linguistic Theory", in which he outlined the transformational generative grammar approach to linguistics. In June 1964, he delivered a series of lectures at the Linguistic Institute of the Linguistic Society of America (these were later published in 1966 as Topics in the Theory of Generative Grammar).

All of these activities aided to develop what is now known as the "Standard Theory" of TGG, in which the basic formulations of Syntactic Structures underwent considerable revision. In 1965, eight years after the publication of Syntactic Structures, Chomsky published Aspects partly as an acknowledgment of this development and partly as a guide for future directions for the field.

== Overview of topics ==
As British linguist Peter Hugoe Matthews noted in his review of the book, the content of Aspects can be divided into two distinct parts: Chapter 1 is concerned with the psychological reality of language and the philosophy of language research, and the rest of the chapters deal with specific technical details within generative grammar.

=== The goal of linguistic theory ===
==== Competence vs. performance: descriptive adequacy ====
In Aspects, Chomsky lays down the abstract, idealized context in which a linguistic theorist is supposed to perform his research: "Linguistic theory is concerned primarily with an ideal speaker-listener, in a completely homogeneous speech-community, who knows its language perfectly and is unaffected by such grammatically irrelevant conditions as memory limitations, distractions, shifts of attention and interest, and errors (random or characteristic) in applying his knowledge of the language in actual performance." He makes a "fundamental distinction between competence (the speaker-hearer's knowledge of his language) and performance (the actual use of language in concrete situation)." A "grammar of a language" is "a description of the ideal speaker-hearer's intrinsic competence", and this "underlying competence" is a "system of generative processes." An "adequate grammar" should capture the basic regularities and the productive nature of a language. Chomsky calls this "descriptive adequacy" of the linguistic theory, in the sense that "it correctly describes its object, namely the linguistic intuition—the tacit competence—of the native speaker. In this sense, the grammar is justified on external grounds, on grounds of correspondence to linguistic fact."

==== Language acquisition, universal grammar and explanatory adequacy ====
Additionally, Chomsky sets forth another ambitious goal for linguistic theory in Aspects: that it has to be "sufficiently rich to account for acquisition of language, yet not so rich as to be inconsistent with the known diversity of language." In other words, linguistic theory must be able to describe how any normal human child masters the complexities of his mother tongue at such a young age, and how children all over the world master languages which are enormously different from one another in terms of vocabulary, word order and morpho-syntactic constructions.

In Chomsky's opinion, in order for a linguistic theory to be justified on "internal grounds" and to achieve "explanatory adequacy", it has to show how a child's brain, when exposed to primary linguistic data, uses special innate abilities or strategies (described as a set of principles called "Universal Grammar") and selects the correct grammar of the language over many other grammars compatible with the same data.

==== Grammaticality and acceptability ====
For Chomsky, "grammaticalness is ... a matter of degree." When sentences are directly generated by the system of grammatical rules, they are called "perfectly" or "strictly well-formed" grammatical sentences. When sentences are "derivatively generated" by "relaxing" some grammatical rules (such as "subcategorization rules" or "selectional rules"), they deviate from strictly well-formedness. Chomsky calls these grammatically "deviant". The degree and manner of their deviation can be evaluated by comparing their structural description with that of the strictly well-formed sentences. In this way, a theory of "degree of grammaticalness" can eventually be developed.

According to Chomsky, an "acceptable" sentence is one that is "perfectly natural" and "immediately comprehensible" and "in no way bizarre or outlandish". The notion of acceptability depends on various "dimensions" such as "rapidity, correctness, and uniformity of recall and recognition, normalcy of intonation". Chomsky adds that "acceptability is a concept that belongs to the study of performance, whereas grammaticalness belongs to the study of competence." So, there can be sentences that are grammatical but nevertheless unacceptable because of "memory limitations" or intonational and stylistic factors."

==== Emphasis on mentalism ====
In Aspects Chomsky writes that "linguistic theory is mentalistic, since it is concerned with discovering a mental reality underlying actual behavior." With this mentalist interpretation of linguistic theory, Chomsky elevated linguistics to a field that is part of a broader theory of human mind, i.e. the cognitive sciences. According to Chomsky, a human child's mind is equipped with a "language acquisition device" formed by inborn mental properties called "linguistic universals" which eventually constructs a mental theory of the child's mother tongue. The linguist's main object of inquiry, as Chomsky sees it, is this underlying psychological reality of language. Instead of making catalogs and summaries of linguistic behavioral data demonstrated on the surface (i.e. behaviorism), a Chomsky-an linguist should be interested in using "introspective data" to ascertain the properties of a deeper mental system.

The mentalist approach to linguistics proposed by Chomsky is also different from an investigation of the neurophysiological mechanisms underlying language. It is about abstractly determining the properties and functions of such mechanisms.

=== The structure of grammar: deep structure ===
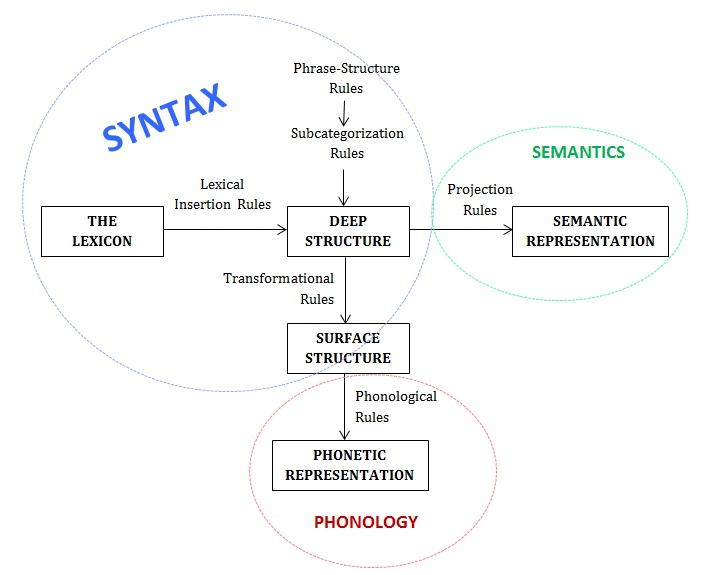
The grammar model discussed in Noam Chomsky's Aspects of the Theory of Syntax (1965)

In Aspects, Chomsky summarized his proposed structure of a grammar in the following way: "A grammar contains a syntactic component, a semantic component and a phonological component...The syntactic component consists of a base and a transformational component. The base, in turn, consists of a categorial subcomponent and a lexicon. The base generates deep structures. A deep structure enters the semantic component and receives a semantic interpretation; it is mapped by transformational rules into a surface structure, which is then given a phonetic interpretation by the rules of the phonological component." In this grammar model, syntax is given a prominent, generative role, whereas phonology and semantics are assigned secondary, interpretive roles. This theory of grammar would later come to be known as the "Standard Theory" (ST).

==== The base subcomponent ====
The base in the syntactic component functions as follows: In the first step, a simple set of phrase structure rules generate tree diagrams (sometimes called Phrase Markers) consisting of nodes and branches, but with empty terminal nodes; these are called "pre-lexical structures". In the second step, the empty terminal nodes are filled with complex symbols consisting of morphemes accompanied by syntactic and semantic features, supplied from the lexicon via lexical insertion rules. The resulting tree diagram is called a "deep structure".

=== Comparison with the Syntactic Structures model ===
The Aspects model or ST differed from Syntactic Structures (1957) in a number of ways. Firstly, the notion of kernel sentences (a class of sentences produced by applying obligatory transformational rules) was abandoned and replaced by the notion of "deep structures", within which negative, interrogative markers, etc. are embedded. This simplified the generation of "surface" sentences, whereas in the previous model, a number of successive optional transformational rules had to be applied on the kernel sentences to arrive at the same result.

Secondly, the addition of a semantic component to the grammar marked an important conceptual change since Syntactic Structures, where the role of meaning was effectively neglected and not considered part of the grammatical model. Chomsky mentions that the semantic component is essentially the same as described in Katz and Postal (1964).

Among the more technical innovations are the use of recursive phrase structure rules and the introduction of syntactic features in lexical entries to address the issue of subcategorization.

=== Syntactic features ===
In Chapter 2 of Aspects, Chomsky discusses the problem of subcategorization of lexical categories and how this information should be captured in a generalized manner in the grammar. He deems that rewriting rules are not the appropriate device in this regard. As a solution, he borrows the idea of features use in phonology. A lexical category such as noun, verb, etc. is represented by a symbol such as N, V. etc. A set of "subcategorization rules" then analyzes these symbols into "complex symbols", each complex symbol being a set of specified "syntactic features", grammatical properties with binary values.

Syntactic feature is one of the most important technical innovations of the Aspects model. Most contemporary grammatical theories have preserved it.

== Significance ==
Linguistics

UCLA linguist Tim Stowell considers Aspects to be "effectively the most important foundational document of the field" of transformational generative grammar (TGG), providing "the definitive exposition of the classical theory of TGG—the so-called Standard Theory".

University of Cambridge linguists Ian Roberts and Jeffrey Watumull maintain that Aspects ushered in the "Second Cognitive Revolution—the revival of rationalist philosophy first expounded in the Enlightenment", in particular by Leibniz.

Philosophy

Moral philosopher John Rawls compared building a theory of morality to that of the generative grammar model found in Aspects. In A Theory of Justice (1971), he notes that just like Chomsky's grammar model assumes a set of finite underlying principles that are supposed to adequately explain the variety of sentences in linguistic performance, our sense of justice can be defined as a set of moral principles that give rise to everyday judgments.

Medicine

In his Nobel Prize lecture titled "The Generative Grammar of the Immune System", the 1984 Nobel Prize laureate in Medicine and Physiology Niels K. Jerne used Chomsky's generative grammar model in Aspects to explain the human immune system, comparing "the variable region of a given antibody molecule" to "a sentence". "The immense repertoire of the immune system then becomes ... a lexicon of sentences which is capable of responding to any sentence expressed by the multitude of antigens which the immune system may encounter." Jerne called the DNA segments in chromosomes which encode the variable regions of antibody polypeptides a human's inheritable "deep structures", which can account for the innately complex yet miraculously effective fighting capacity of human antibodies against complex antigens. This is comparable to Chomsky's hypothesis that a child is born with innate language universals to acquire a complex human language in a very short time.

Artificial intelligence

Neuroscientist David Marr wrote that the goal of artificial intelligence is to find and solve information processing problems. First, one must build a computational theory of the problem (i.e. the abstract formulation of the "what" and "why" of the problem). And then one must construct an algorithm that implements it (i.e. the "how" of the problem). Marr likened the computational theory of an information processing problem to the notion of "competence" mentioned in Aspects.

== Criticism ==
Several of the theoretical constructs and principles of the generative grammar introduced in Aspects such as deep structures, transformations, autonomy and primacy of syntax, etc. were either abandoned or substantially revised after they were shown to be either inadequate or too complicated to account for, in a simple and elegant way, many idiosyncratic example sentences from different languages. As a response to these problems encountered within the Standard Theory, a new approach called the generative semantics (as opposed to the interpretive semantics in Aspects) was invented in the early 1970s by some of Chomsky's collaborators (notably George Lakoff), and was incorporated later in the late 1980s into what is now known as the school of cognitive linguistics, at odds with Chomskyan school of generative linguistics. Chomsky himself addressed these issues at around the same time (early 1970s) and updated the model to an "Extended Standard Theory", where syntax was less autonomous, the interaction between the syntactic and the semantic component was much more interactive and the transformations were cyclical.

== Bibliography ==
- Chomsky, Noam (1957), Syntactic Structures, The Hague/Paris: Mouton, ISBN 9783110172799
- Chomsky, Noam (1959), "A Review of B. F. Skinner's Verbal Behavior", Language, 35 (1): 26–58, doi:10.2307/411334, JSTOR 411334
- Chomsky, Noam; Schützenberger, Marcel-Paul (1963), "The Algebraic Theory of Context-Free Languages" (PDF), in P. Braffort; D. Hirschberg (eds.), Computer Programming and Formal Systems, North Holland, pp. 118–161
- Chomsky, Noam (1965), Aspects of the Theory of Syntax, Cambridge, Massachusetts: MIT Press, ISBN 9780262260503
- Chomsky, Noam (1970), Current Issues in Linguistic Theory, Berlin and New York: Mouton de Gruyter
- Chomsky, Noam (1973), "Conditions on transformations", in Anderson, S.R.; Kiparsky, P. (eds.), A festschrift for Morris Halle, New York: Holt, Rinehart and Winston, pp. 232–86
- Gallego, Ángel G.; Ott, Denis (2015), 50 Years Later: Reflections on Chomsky's Aspects, Cambridge, MA: MIT Working Papers in Linguistics
- Halle, Morris (1959), The sound pattern of Russian, The Hague: Mouton, ISBN 9789027915610
- Harris, Randy Allen (1993), The Linguistics Wars, New York: Oxford University Press, ISBN 9780195098341, archived from the original on 2021-03-28
- Jerne, Niels K. (1985), "The generative grammar of the immune system", The EMBO Journal, 4 (4): 847–852, Bibcode:1985Sci...229.1057J, doi:10.1002/j.1460-2075.1985.tb03709.x, PMC 554270, PMID 2410261
- Katz, Jerrold; Postal, Paul (1964), An Integrated Theory of Linguistic Descriptions, Cambridge, Massachusetts: MIT Press
- Klima, Edward S. (1964), "Negation in English", in Jerry Fodor; Jerrold Katz (eds.), The structure of language, Englewood Cliffs, New Jersey: Prentice Hall, pp. 246–323
- Lakoff, George (February 8, 1973), "Deep Language", The New York Review of Books
- Marr, David (1977), "Artificial Intelligence — A Personal View", Artificial Intelligence, 9: 37–48, doi:10.1016/0004-3702(77)90013-3, hdl:1721.1/5776, S2CID 14308105
- Matthews, P. H. (1967), "Review of Aspects of the Theory of Syntax", Journal of Linguistics, 3 (1): 119–152, doi:10.1017/s0022226700012998, S2CID 145643559
- Rawls, John (1971), A Theory of Justice, Cambridge, Massachusetts: Belknap Press of Harvard University Press
- Smith, Neil; Wilson, Deirdre (1979), Modern Linguistics: The Results of Chomsky's Revolution, Indiana: Indiana University Press
- Yngve, Victor H. (1956), "Mechanical Translation Research at MIT" (PDF), Mechanical Translation, 3 (2): 44–45
