= Gerald Gazdar =

- Born: Gerald James Michael Gazdar; 24 February 1950 (age 76)
- Education: University of East Anglia; University of Reading (PhD)
- Known for: Generalized phrase structure grammars
- Scientific career
- Workplaces: University of Sussex
- Thesis: Formal pragmatics for natural language implicature, presupposition and logical form (1976)
- Doctoral students: Ann Copestake, Adam Kilgarriff
- Website: www.sussex.ac.uk/profiles/982

Gerald James Michael Gazdar, FBA (born 24 February 1950) is a British linguist and computer scientist.

== Education ==
He was educated at Heath Mount School, Bradfield College, the University of East Anglia (BA, 1970) and the University of Reading (MA, PhD).

== Career and research ==
Gazdar was appointed a lecturer at the University of Sussex in 1975, and became Professor of Computational Linguistics there in 1985. He retired in 2002.

Gazdar defined Linear Indexed Grammars and pioneered, along with his colleagues Ewan Klein, Geoffrey Pullum and Ivan Sag, the framework of Generalized Phrase Structure Grammars.
