= Computational semantics =

Meaning represented by natural language

Computational semantics is a subfield of computational linguistics. Its goal is to elucidate the cognitive mechanisms supporting the generation and interpretation of meaning in humans. It usually involves the creation of computational models that simulate particular semantic phenomena, and the evaluation of those models against data from human participants. While computational semantics is a scientific field, it has many applications in real-world settings and substantially overlaps with Artificial Intelligence.

Broadly speaking, the discipline can be subdivided into areas that mirror the internal organization of linguistics. For example, lexical semantics and frame semantics have active research communities within computational linguistics. Some popular methodologies are also strongly inspired by traditional linguistics. Most prominently, the area of distributional semantics, which underpins investigations into embeddings and the internals of Large Language Models, has roots in the work of Zellig Harris.

Some traditional topics of interest in computational semantics are: construction of meaning representations, semantic underspecification, anaphora resolution, presupposition projection, and quantifier scope resolution. Methods employed usually draw from formal semantics or statistical semantics. Computational semantics has points of contact with the areas of lexical semantics (word-sense disambiguation and semantic role labeling), discourse semantics, knowledge representation and automated reasoning (in particular, automated theorem proving). Since 1999 there has been an ACL special interest group on computational semantics, SIGSEM.

== See also ==
- Discourse representation theory
- Formal semantics (natural language)
- Minimal recursion semantics
- Natural-language understanding
- Semantic compression
- Semantic parsing
- Semantic Web
- SemEval
- WordNet
