= Robert Lees (linguist) =

American linguist (1922–1996)

- Born: July 9, 1922
- Died: December 6, 1996 (aged 74)

Academic background
- Education: Massachusetts Institute of Technology (Ph.D.)
- Doctoral advisor: Noam Chomsky

Academic work
- Discipline: linguistics
- Institutions: University of Illinois Urbana–Champaign, Tel Aviv University, University of Delhi
- Doctoral students: Frederick Newmeyer

Robert B. Lees (9 July 1922 – 6 December 1996) was an American linguist and professor of linguistics at the University of Illinois Urbana–Champaign.

== Education ==
Lees went to the Massachusetts Institute of Technology in 1956 to work on its machine translation project. He first came to notice with an influential review of Noam Chomsky's Syntactic Structures (1957) and with his 1960 book The Grammar of English Nominalizations. Lees was later dismissed from his research position by Victor Yngve, as Lees had wanted to continue working on straight linguistics rather than on machine translation. He then enrolled in the electrical engineering department at MIT, from which he obtained his Ph.D. in linguistics under Chomsky. Lees' role in fostering Chomskyan transformational generative grammar is discussed in Newmeyer (1986: 35-36).

== Career ==
Lees was the first Head of the Department of Linguistics at the University of Illinois Urbana–Champaign, serving from 1965 to 1968. In 1969, Lees moved to Israel to teach at Tel Aviv University, and he established the university's linguistics department in 1970.

Lees also went to India on a tour under the patronization of the Ford Foundation. He taught intensive courses on contemporary linguistics at Delhi University and at the Central Institute of English and Foreign Languages in Hyderabad.

Lees was known as a fierce partisan of Chomsky's brand of linguistics and could be withering in his criticism. A famous example is his response when informed that Nelson Francis had received a grant to produce the Brown Corpus: "That is a complete waste of your time and the government's money. You are a native speaker of English; in ten minutes you can produce more illustrations of any point in English grammar than you will find in many millions of words of random text."

== Selected works ==
- The Phonology of Modern Standard Turkish. Routledge Curzan. ISBN 978-0-7007-0806-2
- English for Turks. Spoken Language Serv 1981, ISBN 978-0-87950-614-8
- with Braj B. Kachru, Yacov Malkiel, Angelina Pietrangeli: Issues in Linguistics: Papers in Honor of Henry and Renee Kahane. University of Illinois Press 1974, ISBN 978-0-252-00246-5
- The Grammar of English Nominalizations
- The Basis of Glottochronology. Language, 29 (1953)

For a bibliography of Lees's publications, see Sadock and Vanek 1970.

== Bibliography ==
- Biber, D., and E. Finegan. 1991. "On the exploitation of computerized corpora in variation studies." In K. Aijmer and B. Altenberg (eds.), English corpus linguistics: Studies in honour of Jan Svartvik, 204-220. London: Longman.
