= Carl Pollard =

American linguist

Carl Jesse Pollard (born June 28, 1947) is a Professor of Linguistics at the Ohio State University. He is the inventor of head grammar and higher-order grammar, as well as co-inventor of head-driven phrase structure grammar (HPSG).

He is currently also working on convergent grammar (CVG). He has written numerous books and articles on formal syntax and semantics. He received his Ph.D. from Stanford.
