= Frederick Newmeyer =

American linguist (born 1944)

Fritz Newmeyer
- Born: January 30, 1944; Philadelphia, Pennsylvania, U.S.

Academic background
- Education: University of Rochester (B.A., M.A.); University of Illinois Urbana-Champaign (Ph.D.)
- Thesis: English Aspectual Verbs (1969)
- Doctoral advisor: Robert B. Lees

Academic work
- Discipline: Linguist
- Institutions: University of Washington, University of British Columbia, Simon Fraser University

Frederick J. "Fritz" Newmeyer (born January 30, 1944) is an American linguist who is professor emeritus of linguistics at the University of Washington and adjunct professor at the University of British Columbia and Simon Fraser University. He has published widely in theoretical and English syntax and is best known for his work on the history of generative syntax and for his arguments that linguistic formalism (i.e. generative grammar) and linguistic functionalism are not incompatible, but rather complementary. In the early 1990s he was one of the linguists who helped to renew interest in the evolutionary origin of language. More recently, Newmeyer argued that facts about linguistic typology are better explained by parsing constraints than by the principles and parameters model of grammar. Nevertheless, he has continued to defend the basic principles of generative grammar, arguing that Ferdinand de Saussure's langue/parole distinction as well Noam Chomsky's distinction between linguistic competence and linguistic performance are essentially correct.

== Early life and education ==
Newmeyer was born in Philadelphia, but grew up in Port Washington, New York. He received his BA in geology from the University of Rochester in 1965 and his MA in linguistics from that same institution two years later. Newmeyer earned a PhD in linguistics from the University of Illinois Urbana-Champaign in 1969, writing a dissertation entitled English Aspectual Verbs under the direction of Robert B. Lees.

== Career ==
Newmeyer's only permanent position has been in the Department of Linguistics at the University of Washington (from 1969 until his retirement in 2006), but he has held visiting positions at a variety of universities around the world, including the University of Edinburgh, Wayne State University, University of London, Cornell University, University of Maryland, UCLA, La Trobe University, Universidade de São Paulo, Universidad Nacional del Comahue, Universiteit van Tilburg, Heinrich-Heine-Universität Düsseldorf, École Normale Supérieure, Institut des Science Cognitives, Max Planck Institute for Evolutionary Anthropology, and University of Ljubljana. In 2002, Newmeyer was President of the Linguistic Society of America, from 2003 to 2006 Howard and Frances Nostrand Professor of Linguistics at Washington, and in 2006 he was elected Fellow of the American Association for the Advancement of Science and Fellow of the Linguistic Society of America.

== Personal life ==
In his 20s and 30s, Newmeyer was heavily involved in left politics, being an active member of Students for a Democratic Society in the late 1960s and of the International Socialists from 1971 to 1977. He was married to Carolyn Platt between 1968 and 1973, and in 1993 he married Marilyn Goebel. In 2006, he and Goebel moved to Vancouver, British Columbia.

== Publications ==
=== Books written ===
- 1975. English Aspectual Verbs. The Hague: Mouton and Company.
- 1980. Linguistic Theory in America: The First Quarter Century of Transformational Generative Grammar. New York: Academic Press. Second edition 1986. First edition translated into Spanish 1982, Madrid: Alianza Editorial. Translations of second edition: Korean 1995, Seoul: Kul Press. Chinese 1998, Taipei: Crane Publishing Co, Ltd.; Japanese translation under contract.
- 1983. Grammatical Theory: Its Limits and Its Possibilities. Chicago: University of Chicago Press. Malay translation 1996, Kuala Lumpur: Dewan Bahasa dan Pustaka.
- 1986. The Politics of Linguistics. Chicago: University of Chicago Press. Japanese translation 1994, Tokyo: Iwanami Shoten Publishers. Arabic translation 1997, Abha (Saudi Arabia): The Literary Club. Persian translation 2002, Ney (Iran).
- 1996. Generative Linguistics: A Historical Perspective. London: Routledge.
- 1998. Language Form and Language Function. Cambridge, MA: MIT Press.
- 2005. Possible and Probable Languages: A Generative Perspective on Linguistic Typology. Oxford: Oxford University Press.

=== Books edited ===
- 1986. A Festschrift for Sol Saporta (with Michael Brame and Heles Contreras). Linguistic Research Monograph Series Publication. Seattle: Noit Amrofer Press.
- 1988. Linguistics: The Cambridge Survey. Cambridge: Cambridge University Press. Spanish translation published 1990-1992 as Panorama de la Lingüística Moderna, Madrid:Visor Distribuciones.
  - Volume I: Linguistic Theory: Foundations.
  - Volume II: Linguistic Theory: Extensions and Implications.
  - Volume III: Language: Psychological and Biological Aspects.
  - Volume IV: Language: The Socio-Cultural Context.
- 1998. Functionalism and Formalism in Linguistics (with Michael Darnell, Edith Moravcsik, Michael Noonan, and Kathleen Wheatley). Studies in Language Companion Series, Volume 41. Amsterdam: John Benjamins.
  - Volume I: General Papers.
  - Volume II: Case Studies.
