= Constructional system =

A constructional system or a constitution system is a system of objects or concepts of a certain domain in which all objects or concepts of that domain can be logically constructed from a proper subset of those objects or concepts, called the basis of the system.

The notion of constructional systems can be traced back to Bertrand Russell, who wrote in 1914 that

The supreme maxim in scientific philosophising is this: wherever possible logical constructions are to be substituted for inferred entities.

German philosopher Rudolf Carnap in his Der logische Aufbau der Welt (1928) (referring to them as "Konstitutionssystems") and American philosopher Nelson Goodman in his The Structure of Appearance (1951) studied the structure of constructional systems.

== Cited works ==
- Cohnitz, Daniel; Rossberg, Marcus (2014), Nelson Goodman, Routledge
- Russell, Bertrand (1914), Our Knowledge of the External World
