= Apptek =

American AI company

Applications Technology (AppTek) is a U.S. company headquartered in McLean, Virginia that specializes in artificial intelligence and machine learning for human language technologies. The company provides both managed and professional services for natural language processing (NLP) technologies including automatic speech recognition (ASR), neural machine translation (MT), natural-language understanding (NLU) and neural speech synthesis.

AppTek's Head of Science, Prof. Dr. -Ing Hermann Ney, was awarded the IEEE James L. Flanagan Speech and Audio Processing Award in 2019 and the ISCA Medal for Scientific Achievement in 2021 for his work in natural language processing.

== History ==
AppTek was acquired in 1998 by Lernout & Hauspie (at the time a NASDAQ publicly traded company), AppTek organized a management buy-out and went private again in 2001. In 2014, the company sold its hybrid machine translation technology to eBay and has since rebuilt the platform to modern neural-based approaches for machine translation. In 2020, SOSi acquired non-controlling interest in AppTek and became an exclusive reseller of AppTek products for U.S. federal, state, and local government entities.

== See also ==
- Google Translate
- Microsoft Translator
- vidby
- DeepL
