= Ivan Sag =

Linguist and cognitive scientist

- Born: November 9, 1949; Alliance, Ohio, US
- Died: September 10, 2013 (aged 63); Menlo Park, California, US
- Spouse: Penny Eckert

Academic background
- Education: University of Rochester (BA); University of Pennsylvania (MA); Massachusetts Institute of Technology (PhD)
- Thesis: Deletion and logical form (1976)
- Doctoral advisor: Noam Chomsky

Academic work
- Discipline: Linguist
- Institutions: Stanford University

Ivan Andrew Sag (November 9, 1949 – September 10, 2013) was an American linguist and cognitive scientist. He did research in areas of syntax and semantics as well as work in computational linguistics.

== Personal life ==
Born in Alliance, Ohio on November 9, 1949, Sag attended the Mercersburg Academy but was expelled shortly before graduation. He received a BA from the University of Rochester, an MA from the University of Pennsylvania—where he studied comparative Indo-European languages, Sanskrit, and sociolinguistics—and a PhD from MIT in 1976, writing his dissertation (advised by Noam Chomsky) on ellipsis.

Sag received a Mellon Fellowship at Stanford University in 1978–79, and remained in California from that point on. He was appointed a position in Linguistics at Stanford, and earned tenure there. He died of cancer in 2013. He was married to sociolinguist Penelope Eckert.

== Academic work ==
Sag made notable contributions to the fields of syntax, semantics, pragmatics, and language processing. His early work was as a member of the research teams that invented and developed head-driven phrase structure grammar (HPSG) as well as generalized phrase structure grammar, HPSG's immediate intellectual predecessor. Later, he worked on Sign-Based Construction Grammar, which blended HPSG with ideas from Berkeley Construction Grammar.

He was the author or co-author of 10 books and over 100 articles. In general, his research late in life primarily concerned constraint-based, lexicalist models of grammar, and their relation to theories of language processing.

Sag was the Sadie Dernham Patek Professor in Humanities, Professor of Linguistics, and Director of the Symbolic Systems Program at Stanford University. A fellow of the American Academy of Arts and Sciences and the Linguistic Society of America, in 2005 he received the LSA's Fromkin Prize for distinguished contributions to the field of linguistics.

He was honored by a volume of studies published in 2013 in his honor, The Core and the Periphery: Data-Driven Perspectives on Syntax Inspired by Ivan A. Sag, edited by Philip Hofmeister and Elisabeth Norcliffe.

== Selected publications ==
- Sag, Ivan A. 1980. Deletion and Logical Form. New York:Garland Press.
- Gazdar, Gerald, Ewan Klein, Geoffrey K. Pullum, and Ivan A. Sag. 1985. Generalized Phrase Structure Grammar. Cambridge, MA: Harvard University Press and Oxford: Basil Blackwell's.
- Sag, Ivan A., Gerald Gazdar, Thomas Wasow and Steven Weisler. 1985. "Coordination and How to Distinguish Categories." Natural Language and Linguistic Theory 3:117–171
- Pollard, Carl, and Ivan A. Sag. 1987. Information-Based Syntax and Semantics; Volume One - Fundamentals. CSLI Lecture Notes Series No. 13. Stanford: CSLI Publications. Distributed by University of Chicago Press.
- Nunberg, Geoffrey, Ivan A. Sag, and Thomas Wasow. 1994. "Idioms." Language 70:491– 538.
- Pollard, Carl, and Ivan A. Sag. 1992. "Anaphors in English and the Scope of Binding Theory." Linguistic Inquiry 23.2:261–303.
- Pollard, Carl, and Ivan A. Sag. 1994. Head-Driven Phrase Structure Grammar. Chicago: University of Chicago Press and Stanford: CSLI Publications.
- Miller, Philip, and Ivan A. Sag. 1997. "French Clitic Movement Without Clitics or Movement." Natural Language and Linguistic Theory 15:573–639.
- Sag, Ivan A. 1997. "English Relative Clause Constructions." Journal of Linguistics 33.2:431–484.
- Jonathan Ginzburg and Ivan A. Sag. 2000. Interrogative Investigations: the form, meaning, and use of English Interrogatives. Stanford: CSLI Publications.
- Bouma, Gosse, Robert Malouf, and Ivan A. Sag. 2001. "Satisfying Constraints on Extraction and Adjunction." Natural Language and Linguistic Theory 19.1:1–65.
- Kim, Jong-Bok, and Ivan A. Sag. 2002. "French and English Negation without Head-Movement." Natural Language and Linguistic Theory 20.2:339-412.
- Sag, Ivan A., Thomas Wasow, and Emily Bender. 2003. Syntactic Theory: A formal introduction. Second edition. Stanford: CSLI Publications.
