= Andrew Radford (linguist) =

British linguist (1945–2024)

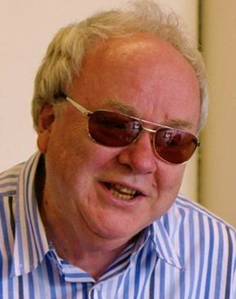
- Born: 3 July 1945; Woking, Surrey, England
- Died: 16 December 2024 (aged 79)
- Education: Trinity College, Cambridge
- Known for: Generative grammar, Principles and Parameters of language development, structure building model of child language acquisition
- Scientific career
- Fields: Generative grammar, syntax, child language acquisition
- Workplaces: University of Cambridge, University of Oxford, University of East Anglia, University College of North Wales, University of Essex
- Doctoral advisor: Pieter Seuren: a research fellow at the Max Planck Institute for Psycholinguistics at Nijmegen

Andrew Radford (3 July 1945 – 16 December 2024) was a British linguist known for his work in syntax and child language acquisition. His first important contribution to the field was his 1977 book on Italian syntax, a revised version of his doctoral thesis. He achieved international recognition in 1981 for his book Transformational Syntax, which sold over 30,000 copies and was the standard introduction to Chomsky's Government and Binding Theory for many years; and this was followed by an introduction to transformational grammar in 1988, which sold over 70,000. He has since published several books on syntax within the framework of generative grammar and the Minimalist Program of Noam Chomsky, a number of which have appeared in the series Cambridge Textbooks in Linguistics.

In the 1990s, Radford was a pioneer of the maturation-based structure building model of child language, and the acquisition of functional categories in early child English within the principles and parameters framework, in which children are seen as gradually building up more and more complex structures, with lexical categories (like noun and verb) being acquired before functional-syntactic categories (like determiner and complementiser); this research resulted in the publication of a monograph titled Syntactic Theory and the Acquisition of English Syntax in 1990, and numerous articles on the acquisition of syntax by monolingual, bilingual, and language-disordered children.

Radford began researching the syntax of colloquial English in 2010, using data recorded from unscripted radio and TV broadcasts. On this topic, he produced a research monograph and various articles, and pursued further research on syntax of relative clauses in colloquial English.

From January 2014 until the time of his death, Radford was an Emeritus Professor of the Department of Language and Linguistics at the University of Essex.

== Education ==
Radford pursued undergraduate studies at Trinity College, Cambridge, reading Modern Languages (French, Italian and Romanian), Linguistics and Romance Philology. He graduated with a first-class degree and was awarded a research scholarship by Trinity College, Cambridge. He completed a PhD on Italian syntax there, supervised by Pieter Seuren.

== Career ==
Radford was a Research Fellow in Linguistics at Trinity College, Cambridge from 1971 to 1975, before taking up posts as lecturer in Linguistics in the School of English & American Studies at the University of East Anglia (1975–76), Lecturer in Linguistics in the Faculty of Modern & Medieval Languages at the University of Oxford (1976–78), and Reader in Linguistics in the Department of Language and Linguistics at the University of Essex (1978–80). In 1980, he became Professor of Linguistics at the University College of North Wales, serving first as Head of the Department of Linguistics (1980–87), and later as Head of the School of Modern Languages and Linguistics (1987–89). In 1989, he returned to the University of Essex as Professor of Linguistics, where he served three terms as Head of the Department of Language and Linguistics, and one as Dean of the School of Humanities and Comparative Studies. He retired at the end of 2013, and acquired the status of Emeritus Professor.

He served on the editorial board of the Journal of Linguistics, Journal of Child Language, Studies in Theoretical Psycholinguistics, Studies in Language Sciences, Chomskyan Studies, Rivista di Grammatica Generativa, and Iberia. He also served two spells as a member of the Linguistics Review Panel for the Higher Education Funding Council for England.

== Structure building model ==
In his 1990 book, Syntactic Theory and the Acquisition of English Syntax, Radford summarizes the state of a maturation hypothesis for child language acquisition. Working within the principles and parameters framework as his point of departure, and drawing from previous work done by Hagit Borer and Kenneth Wexler on the apparent absence of A-chains in early grammar, Radford proposed a structure-building model focused (inter alia) on the lack of syntactic movement-operations in the early multi-word stage of child English syntax, viz. the lack of inflectional morphology. This led to an analysis that described children as gradually building up increasingly complex structure, with Lexical/thematic stage-1 (lexical categories like noun and verb) preceding Functional/syntactic stage-2 (functional categories like determiner and complementiser).

== Publications ==
=== Books by Radford ===
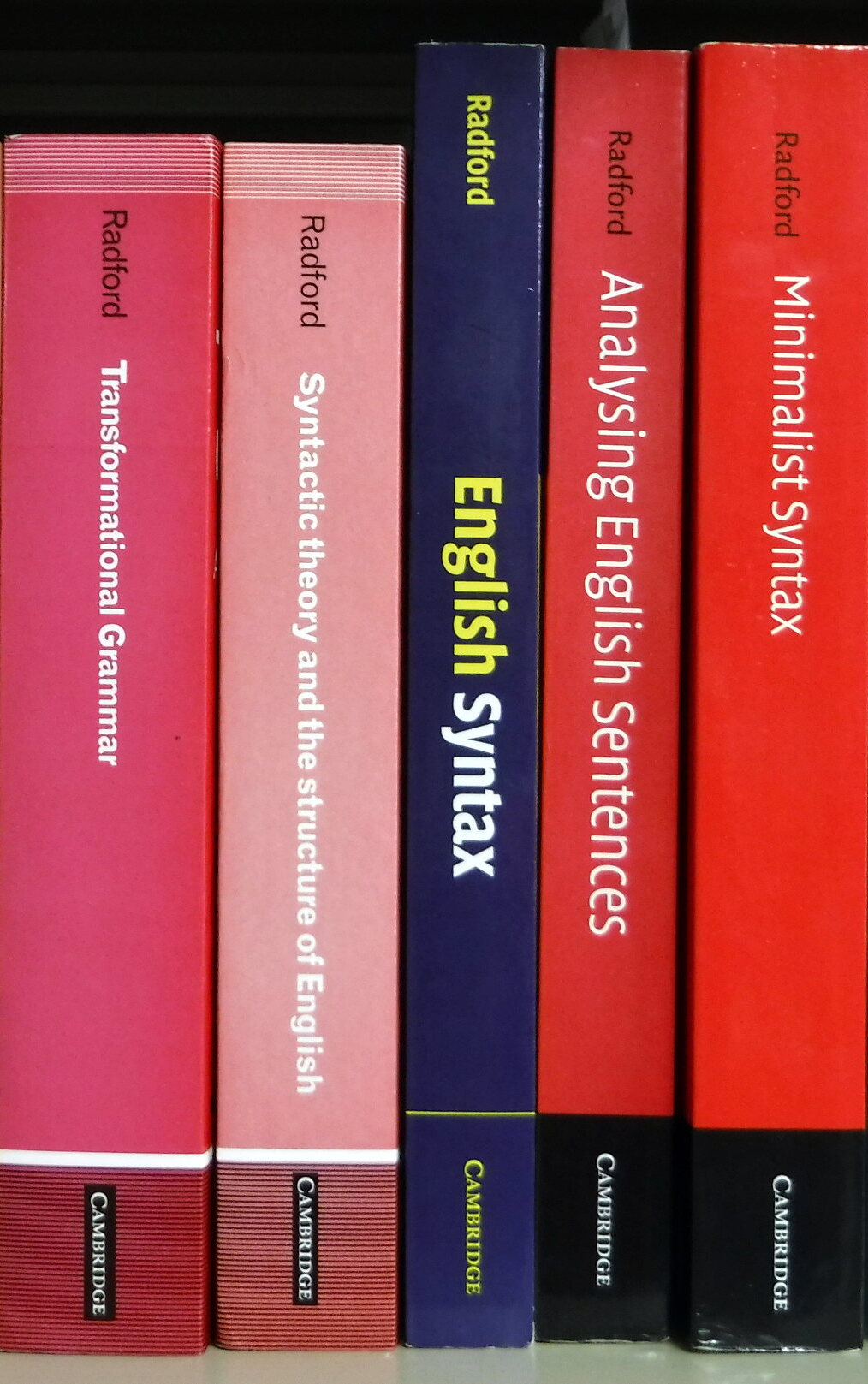
Some books by Andrew Radford

- Italian Syntax: Transformational and Relational Grammar. Cambridge Studies in Linguistics. Cambridge: Cambridge University Press, 1977. OCLC 969951421.
- Transformational Syntax: A Student's Guide to Chomsky's Extended Standard Theory. Cambridge Textbooks in Linguistics. Cambridge: Cambridge University Press, 1981. Paperback ISBN 0-521-28574-7; hardback ISBN 0-521-24274-6.
  - La sintassi trasformazionale: Introduzione alla Teoria Standard Estesa di Chomsky. Bologna: Il Mulino, 1983. ISBN 8815001816. Italian translation.
  - 변형 문법 이란 무엇 인가 : 촘스키 의 확대 표준 이론 해설 (Pyŏnhyŏng munpŏp iran muŏt in'ga: Ch'omsŭk'i ŭi hwaktae p'yojun iron haesŏl. Seoul: United Publishing and Promotion, 1984. OCLC 232537202. Korean translation.
  - 変形統語論 : チョムスキー拡大標準理論解說 (Henkeitōgoron: Chomusukī kakudai hyōjun riron kaisetsu). Tokyo: Kenkyusha, 1984. ISBN 4-327-40080-7. Japanese translation.
  - Introducción a la sintaxis transformativa: Teoría estándard extendida. Barcelona: Teide, 1988. ISBN 843077453X. Spanish translation.
- Transformational Grammar: A First Course. Cambridge Textbooks in Linguistics. Cambridge: Cambridge University Press, 1988. Paperback ISBN 0-521-34750-5; hardback ISBN 0-521-34506-5; International Student Edition, 2009. ISBN 9780521148634.
  - Tatabahasa transformasi. Kuala Lumpur: Dewan Bahasa dan Pustaka, 1994. ISBN 9836242473. Malay translation.
  - 转换生成语法敎程 (Zhuan huan sheng cheng yu fa jiao cheng). Beijing: Wai yu jiao xue yu yan jiu chu ban she, 2000. ISBN 9787560020099. English, with Chinese introduction.
- Syntactic Theory and the Acquisition of English Syntax: The Nature of Early Child Grammars of English. Oxford: Blackwell, 1990. Paperback ISBN 0-631-16358-1; hardback ISBN 0-631-16357-3.
- Syntactic Theory and the Structure of English. Cambridge Textbooks in Linguistics. Cambridge: Cambridge University Press, 1997. Paperback ISBN 0-521-47707-7; hardback ISBN 978-0521-47125-1.
  - 最简方案 : 句法理论与英语结构 (Zui jian fang an: Ju fa li lun yu ying yu jie gou). Beijing: Beijing da xue chu ban she, 2002. ISBN 9787301053508. In English with a publisher's note in Chinese.
- Syntax: A Minimalist Introduction. Cambridge Textbooks in Linguistics. Cambridge: Cambridge University Press, 1997. Paperback ISBN 0-521-58914-2; hardback ISBN 0-521-58122-2. An abridged version of Syntactic Theory and the Structure of English.
  - 최소주의 통사론 (Ch'oesojuŭi t'ongsaron). Seoul: Hansin Munhwasa, 1999. ISBN 8934805447. Korean translation.
  - 句法学 : 最简方案导论 (Ju fa xue: Zui jian fang an dao lun). [Beijing]: Wai yu jiao xue yu yan jiu chu ban she, [2000]. ISBN 9787560019604. In English, with an introduction in Chinese.
  - 入門ミニマリスト統語論 (Nyūmon minimarisuto tōgoron). Tokyo: Kenkyusha, 2000. ISBN 4-327-40122-6. Japanese translation.
- Minimalist Syntax: Exploring the Structure of English. Cambridge Textbooks in Linguistics. Cambridge: Cambridge University Press, 2004. Paperback ISBN 978-0-521-54274-6; hardback ISBN 978-0-521-83497-1.
  - Minimalist Syntax: Exploring the Structure of English = 最简句法入门 : 探究英语的结构. Beijing: Foreign Language Teaching and Research Press, 2009. ISBN 9787560081458. In English, with introduction in Chinese.
- English Syntax: An Introduction. Cambridge: Cambridge University Press, 2004. Paperback ISBN 978-0-521-54275-3; hardback ISBN 978-0-521-83499-5; South Asian Edition, 2007. ISBN 978-0-521-71152-4. An abridged version of Minimal Syntax.
- Analysing English Sentences. A Minimalist Approach. Cambridge Textbooks in Linguistics. Cambridge: Cambridge University Press, 2009. Paperback ISBN 978-0-521-73191-1; hardback ISBN 978-0-521-51697-6.
- An Introduction to English Sentence Structure. Cambridge: Cambridge University Press, 2009. Paperback ISBN 978-0-521-73190-4; hardback ISBN 978-0-521-51693-8; International Student Edition, 2010. ISBN 978-0-521-15730-8.
- Analysing English Sentences. 2nd ed. Cambridge Textbooks in Linguistics. Cambridge: Cambridge University Press, 2016. Paperback ISBN 978-0-521-66970-2; hardback ISBN 978-0-521-66008-2.
- Colloquial English: Structure and Variation. Cambridge Studies in Linguistics. Cambridge: Cambridge University Press, 2018. Paperback ISBN 978-1-108-44869-7, hardback ISBN 978-1-108-42805-7.
- Relative Clauses: Structure and Variation in Everyday English. Cambridge Studies in Linguistics. Cambridge: Cambridge University Press, 2019. Paperback ISBN 978-1-108-72968-0, hardback ISBN 978-1-108-49280-5

=== Books cowritten by Radford ===
- Linguistics: An Introduction. Cambridge: Cambridge University Press, 1999. ISBN 0-521-47854-5. With Martin Atkinson, David Britain, Harald Clahsen, and Andrew Spencer.
  - Introducción a la lingüística. Madrid: Cambridge University Press, 2000. ISBN 9788483230947. Madrid: Akal, 2000. ISBN 9788446030720. Spanish translation.
  - 语言学教程 (Yu yan xue jiao cheng). Beijing: Wai yu jiao xue yu yan jiu chu ban she, 2000. ISBN 9787560020082. In English, with an introduction in Chinese.
- Linguistics: An Introduction. 2nd ed. Cambridge: Cambridge University Press, 2009. (Paperback ISBN 978-0-521-61478-8; hardback ISBN 978-0-521-84948-7.

=== Other selected publications (2012–) ===
- 2012a Preposition copying and pruning in present-day English. Co-authored with Claudia Felser and Oliver Boxell (Potsdam). English Language and Linguistics 16.3: 403–426.
- 2012b On the feature composition of participial light verbs in French. Co-authored with Michèle Vincent, Ohio State University. In Laura Brugé, Anna Cardinaletti, Giuliana Giusti, Nicola Munaro & Cecilia Poletto (eds) Functional Heads: The Cartography of Syntactic Structures, volume 7, Oxford University Press, New York, pp. 208–219.https://global.oup.com/academic/product/functional-heads-9780199746736?cc=us&lang=en&#
- 2012c On the acquisition of universal and parameterized goal accessibility conditions by Japanese learners of English. Co-authored with Hideki Yokota, Sizuoka University. Second Language 11: 59–94.
- 2013 The complementiser system in spoken English: Evidence from broadcast media. In Information Structure and Agreement, ed. Victoria Camacho-Taboada, Ángel Jiménez-Fernández, Javier Martín González and Mariano Reyes-Tejedor, John Benjamins, Amsterdam, pp. 11–54.https://benjamins.com/#catalog/books/la.197.01rad/details
- 2014 Deconstructing the Subject Condition in terms of cumulative constraint violation. The Linguistic Review 31(1): 73–150. Co-authored with Liliane Haegeman (Ghent) and Ángel Jiménez-Fernández (Sevilla.https://idus.us.es/xmlui/bitstream/handle/11441/23439/tlr-2013-0022%281%29.pdf?sequence=1
- 2015a On Swiping in English. Natural Language and Linguistic Theory 33: 703–44. Co-authored with Eiichi Iwasaki, Waseda University. May 2015. https://link.springer.com/article/10.1007/s11049-014-9265-5.
- 2015b Gaps, ghosts and gapless relatives in spoken English. Studia Linguistica 69: 191–235. Co-authored with Chris Collins, New York University. http://onlinelibrary.wiley.com/doi/10.1111/stul.12033/abstract
