= Alan Sommerstein =

British classical scholar (born 1947)

Alan Herbert Sommerstein
- Born: 1947 (age 78–79); Birmingham, United Kingdom

Academic background
- Education: King's College, Cambridge
- Thesis: Phonological Theory and Ancient Greek (1971)
- Doctoral advisor: W. Sidney Allen and Pieter Seuren

Academic work
- Discipline: Classics
- Sub-discipline: Ancient Greek literature
- Institutions: University of Nottingham
- Notable works: The Comedies of Aristophanes (1980–2002); Aeschylean Tragedy (1996, 2nd ed. 2010); Loeb edition of Aeschylus (2008)

Alan Herbert Sommerstein (born 1947) is a British classical scholar, known above all for his work on ancient Greek tragedy and comedy.

== Biography ==
Sommerstein was born in Birmingham in 1947. After being educated at Merchant Taylors' School, Northwood, he studied classics at King's College, Cambridge. He then studied linguistics for a semester at Indiana University before returning to King's, where he was elected a research fellow in 1970 and obtained his doctorate in 1971. His thesis, written under the supervision of W. Sidney Allen and then Pieter Seuren, was titled "Phonological Theory and Ancient Greek", and a revised version of the second part of this thesis was published in 1973 as a book, The Sound Pattern of Ancient Greek.

In 1974, Sommerstein was appointed as a lecturer in classics at the University of Nottingham, becoming a Reader in 1983 and Professor of Greek in 1988. He served as Head of Department from 1992 to 1997, and again from 2001 to 2002 (following the death of Thomas Wiedemann). He also served as editor of the Journal of Hellenic Studies from 1989 to 1995.

Sommerstein is known for his work on the Greek comic playwright Aristophanes. His interest in this area began in 1969, when he purchased a copy of David Barrett's 1964 Penguin translation of Aristophanes' Frogs and other plays. This led Sommerstein to write and offer to Penguin a translation of Aristophanes' Lysistrata and other plays, which appeared in 1973. The Loeb Classical Library then commissioned Sommerstein and Barrett to prepare a translation of all the plays of Aristophanes for this series. This project did not reach fruition, but a joint Penguin volume containing Birds and other plays appeared in 1978, and Sommerstein alone published texts with translations and commentaries of all eleven plays of Aristophanes in the "Aris and Phillips Classical Texts" series between 1980 and 2002.

The other central focus of Sommerstein's research is the tragic playwright Aeschylus. His earliest and most recent books on Aeschylus are editions with commentaries on Aeschylus' Eumenides (1989) and Suppliants (2019), as part of the "Cambridge Greek and Latin Classics" series published by Cambridge University Press. His book Aeschylean Tragedy, published in 1996 and re-issued in a revised edition in 2010, was received positively by reviewers, with Oliver Thomas commenting that it compared favourably with other available books on Aeschylus. Sommerstein's complete text and translation of the plays and fragments of Aeschylus was released in the Loeb Classical Library series in 2008, and was described by Mark Griffith in the Times Literary Supplement as "in many respects the best critical edition of this playwright available in any format".

In 1998, the Centre for Ancient Drama and its Reception (CADRE) was founded at Nottingham, under Sommerstein's direction. Its first major project was on the fragments of the tragic playwright Sophocles, with a conference in 2000 leading to a collected volume published in 2003, Shards from Kolonos: Studies in Sophoclean Fragments. This project also led to the publication of an edition with translation and commentary on a selection of Sophocles' fragmentary plays, in collaboration with David Fitzpatrick and Thomas Talboy, in 2006, with a second volume appearing in 2012. The reconstruction of fragmentary tragedies also formed the topic of Sommerstein's Gaisford Lecture at the University of Oxford in 2007, "Sherlockismus and the Study of Fragmentary Tragedies", which was then published in 2010 as part of a collection of Sommerstein's essays relating to Greek tragedy.

From 2004 to 2007, Sommerstein was the director of a research project at Nottingham funded by the Leverhulme Trust, "The Oath in Archaic and Classical Greece". This project involved the construction of a database of all references to oaths in Greek texts up to 322 BC, and led to the publication of three jointly authored books between 2007 and 2014.

Sommerstein retired from his Nottingham professorship in January 2014. In 2016, he took over from Christopher Collard as the editor of the "Aris and Phillips Classical Texts" series, retaining this role until 2025.

== Selected publications ==
=== Monographs ===
- Sommerstein, Alan H. (1973). The Sound Pattern of Ancient Greek. Basil Blackwell. ISBN 9780631147701.
- Sommerstein, Alan H. (1977). Modern Phonology. Edward Arnold. ISBN 9780713159622.
- Sommerstein, Alan H. (2002). Greek Drama and Dramatists. Routledge. ISBN 9780415260282.
- Sommerstein, Alan H. (2010). Aeschylean Tragedy (2nd ed.). Duckworth. ISBN 9780715638248.
- Sommerstein, Alan H. (2021). Menander: Epitrepontes. Bloomsbury. ISBN 9781350226685.

=== Editions of ancient texts ===
- Sommerstein, Alan H. (1974). Aristophanes: The Acharnians; The Clouds; Lysistrata. Penguin. ISBN 9780140442878.
- Barrett, David; Sommerstein, Alan H. (1978). Aristophanes: The Knights; Peace; The Birds; The Assemblywomen; Wealth. Penguin. ISBN 9780140443325.
- Sommerstein, Alan H. (1980–2002). The Comedies of Aristophanes. Aris and Phillips. In 12 volumes (with various ISBN numbers).
- Sommerstein, Alan H. (1989). Aeschylus: Eumenides. Cambridge University Press. ISBN 9780521284301.
- Sommerstein, Alan H.; Fitzpatrick, David; Talboy, Thomas (2006). Sophocles: Selected Fragmentary Plays, Volume I. Aris and Phillips. ISBN 9780856687662.
- Sommerstein, Alan H. (2008). Aeschylus. Harvard University Press. In 3 volumes (with various ISBN numbers).
- Sommerstein, Alan H.; Talboy, Thomas (2012). Sophocles: Selected Fragmentary Plays, Volume II. Oxbow Books. ISBN 9781908343185.
- Sommerstein, Alan H. (2013). Menander: Samia. Cambridge University Press. ISBN 9781139044080.
- Sommerstein, Alan H. (2019). Aeschylus: Suppliants. Cambridge University Press. ISBN 9781107686717.

=== Collections of articles ===
- Sommerstein, Alan H. (2009). Talking about Laughter, and Other Studies in Greek Comedy. Oxford University Press. ISBN 9780199554195.
- Sommerstein, Alan H. (2010). The Tangled Ways of Zeus, and Other Studies in and around Greek Tragedy. Oxford University Press. ISBN 9780191614224.

=== Edited volumes ===
- Sommerstein, Alan H., ed. (1993). Tragedy, Comedy and the Polis. Levante. ISBN 9788879490269.
- Sommerstein, Alan H., ed. (2003). Shards from Kolonos: Studies in Sophoclean Fragments. Levante. ISBN 9788879493079.
- Sommerstein, Alan H.; Fletcher, Judith, eds. (2007). Horkos: The Oath in Greek Society. Bristol Phoenix Press. ISBN 9781904675679.
- Sommerstein, Alan H.; Bayliss, Andrew J., eds. (2013). Oath and State in Ancient Greece. De Gruyter. ISBN 9783110285383.
- Sommerstein, Alan H.; Torrance, Isabelle C., eds. (2014). Oaths and Swearing in Ancient Greece. De Gruyter. ISBN 9783110384871.
- Sommerstein, Alan H., ed. (2019). The Encyclopedia of Greek Comedy. Wiley Blackwell. ISBN 9781118605042.
