= Grammar =

Structural rules of a language

In linguistics, grammar is the system of rules that governs how a natural language is structured and used, as evidenced by its speakers or writers. Grammar rules may concern the use of clauses, phrases, and words. The term may also refer to the study of such rules, a subject that includes phonology, morphology, and syntax, together with phonetics, semantics, and pragmatics. There are in effect two different ways to study grammar: traditional grammar and theoretical grammar.

Fluency in a particular language variety involves a speaker internalizing these rules, many or most of which are acquired by observing other speakers, as opposed to intentional study or instruction. Much of this internalization occurs during early childhood; learning a language later in life usually involves more direct instruction. The term grammar can also describe the linguistic behaviour of groups of speakers and writers rather than individuals. Differences in scale can impact this definition: for example, English grammar could describe the rules followed by every one of the language's speakers. At a smaller scale, it may refer to rules shared by smaller groups of speakers.

A description, study, or analysis of such rules may also be known as a grammar, or as a grammar book. A reference work describing the grammar of a language is called a reference grammar or simply a grammar. A fully revealed grammar, which describes the grammatical constructions of a particular speech type in great detail, is called descriptive grammar. This type of linguistic description contrasts with linguistic prescription, a plan to marginalize some constructions while codifying others, either absolutely or in the framework of a standard language. The word grammar often has divergent meanings when used in contexts outside linguistics. It may be used more broadly to include orthographic conventions of written language, such as spelling and punctuation, which are not typically considered part of grammar by linguists; that is, the conventions used for writing a language. It may also be used more narrowly to refer to a set of prescriptive norms only, excluding the aspects of a language's grammar which do not change or are clearly acceptable (or not) without the need for discussions.

== Etymology ==
The word grammar is derived from Greek γραμματικὴ τέχνη (grammatikḕ téchnē), which means "art of letters", from γράμμα (grámma), "letter", itself from γράφειν (gráphein), "to draw, to write". The same Greek root also appears in the words graphics, grapheme, and photograph.

== History ==
The first systematic grammar of Sanskrit originated in Iron Age India, with Yaska (6th century BC), Pāṇini (6th–5th century BC) and his commentators Pingala (c. 200 BC), Katyayana, and Patanjali (2nd century BC). Tolkāppiyam, the earliest Tamil grammar, is mostly dated to before the 5th century AD. The Babylonians also made some early attempts at language description.

Grammar appeared as a discipline in Hellenism from the 3rd century BC forward with authors such as Rhyanus and Aristarchus of Samothrace. The oldest known grammar handbook is the Art of Grammar (Τέχνη Γραμματική), a succinct guide to speaking and writing clearly and effectively, written by the ancient Greek scholar Dionysius Thrax (c. 170 – c. 90 BC), a student of Aristarchus of Samothrace who founded a school on the Greek island of Rhodes. Dionysius Thrax's grammar book remained the primary grammar textbook for Greek schoolboys until as late as the twelfth century AD. The Romans based their grammatical writings on it and its basic format remains the basis for grammar guides in many languages even today. Latin grammar developed by following Greek models from the 1st century BC, due to the work of authors such as Orbilius Pupillus, Remmius Palaemon, Marcus Valerius Probus, Verrius Flaccus, and Aemilius Asper.

The grammar of Irish originated in the 7th century with Auraicept na n-Éces. Arabic grammar emerged with Abu al-Aswad al-Du'ali in the 7th century. The first treatises on Hebrew grammar appeared in the High Middle Ages, in the context of Midrash (exegesis of the Hebrew Bible). The Karaite tradition originated in Abbasid Baghdad. The Diqduq (10th century) is one of the earliest grammatical commentaries on the Hebrew Bible. Ibn Barun in the 12th century, compares the Hebrew language with Arabic in the Islamic grammatical tradition.

Belonging to the trivium of the seven liberal arts, grammar was taught as a core discipline throughout the Middle Ages, following the influence of authors from Late Antiquity, such as Priscian. Treatment of vernaculars began gradually during the High Middle Ages, with isolated works such as the First Grammatical Treatise, but became influential only in the Renaissance and Baroque periods. In 1486, Antonio de Nebrija published Las introduciones Latinas contrapuesto el romance al Latin, and the first Spanish grammar, Gramática de la lengua castellana, in 1492. During the 16th-century Italian Renaissance, the Questione della lingua was the discussion on the status and ideal form of the Italian language, initiated by Dante's de vulgari eloquentia (Pietro Bembo, Prose della volgar lingua Venice 1525). The first grammar of Slovene was written in 1583 by Adam Bohorič, and Grammatica Germanicae Linguae, the first grammar of German, was published in 1578.

Grammars of some languages began to be compiled for the purposes of evangelism and Bible translation from the 16th century onward, such as Grammatica o Arte de la Lengua General de Los Indios de Los Reynos del Perú (1560), a Quechua grammar by Fray Domingo de Santo Tomás.

From the latter part of the 18th century, grammar came to be understood as a subfield of the emerging discipline of modern linguistics. The Deutsche Grammatik of Jacob Grimm was first published in the 1810s. The Comparative Grammar of Franz Bopp, the starting point of modern comparative linguistics, came out in 1833.

== Theoretical frameworks ==
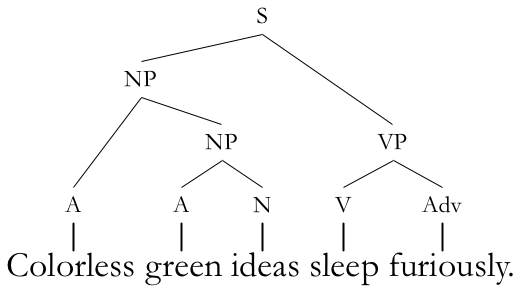
A generative syntax tree in which the sentence (S) breaks down into a noun phrase (NP) and a verb phrase (VP), both of which break down into additional smaller constituents.

Frameworks of grammar which seek to give a precise scientific theory of the syntactic rules of grammar and their function have been developed in theoretical linguistics.

- Dependency grammar: dependency relation (Lucien Tesnière 1959)
  - Link grammar
- Functional grammar (structural–functional analysis):
  - Danish Functionalism
  - Functional Discourse Grammar
  - Role and reference grammar
  - Systemic functional grammar
- Montague grammar
- Cognitive grammar / Cognitive linguistics
  - Construction grammar
    - Fluid Construction Grammar
  - Word grammar
- Generative grammar:
  - Transformational grammar (1960s)
  - Generative semantics (1970s) and Semantic Syntax (1990s)
  - Phrase structure grammar (late 1970s)
    - Generalized phrase structure grammar (late 1970s)
      - Head-driven phrase structure grammar (1985)
      - Principles and parameters grammar (Government and binding theory) (1980s)
  - Lexical functional grammar
  - Categorial grammar (lambda calculus)
  - Minimalist program-based grammar (1993)
- Stochastic grammar: probabilistic
  - Operator grammar

Parse trees are commonly used by such frameworks to depict their rules. There are various alternative schemes for some grammar:

- Affix grammar over a finite lattice
- Backus–Naur form
- Constraint grammar
- Lambda calculus
- Tree-adjoining grammar
- X-bar theory

== Development ==
Grammars evolve through usage. Historically, with the advent of written representations, formal rules about language usage tend to appear also, although such rules tend to describe writing conventions more accurately than conventions of speech. Formal grammars are codifications of usage which are developed by repeated documentation and observation over time. As rules are established and developed, the prescriptive concept of grammatical correctness can arise. This often produces a discrepancy between contemporary usage and that which has been accepted, over time, as being standard or "correct". Linguists tend to view prescriptive grammar as having little justification beyond their authors' aesthetic tastes, although style guides may give useful advice about standard language employment based on descriptions of usage in contemporary writings of the same language. Linguistic prescriptions also form part of the explanation for variation in speech, particularly variation in the speech of an individual speaker (for example, why some speakers say "I didn't do nothing", some say "I didn't do anything", and some say one or the other depending on social context).

The formal study of grammar is an important part of children's schooling from a young age through advanced learning, though the rules taught in schools are not a "grammar" in the sense that most linguists use, particularly as they are prescriptive in intent rather than descriptive.

Constructed languages (also called planned languages or conlangs) are more common in the modern day, although still extremely uncommon compared to natural languages. Many have been designed to aid human communication (for example, naturalistic Interlingua, schematic Esperanto, and the highly logical Lojban). Each of these languages has its own grammar.

Syntax refers to the linguistic structure above the word level (for example, how sentences are formed) – though without taking into account intonation, which is the domain of phonology. Morphology, by contrast, refers to the structure at and below the word level (for example, how compound words are formed), but above the level of individual sounds, which, like intonation, are in the domain of phonology. However, no clear line can be drawn between syntax and morphology. Analytic languages use syntax to convey information that is encoded by inflection in synthetic languages. In other words, word order is not significant, and morphology is highly significant in a purely synthetic language, whereas morphology is not significant and syntax is highly significant in an analytic language. For example, Chinese and Afrikaans are highly analytic, thus meaning is very context-dependent. (Both have some inflections, and both have had more in the past; thus, they are becoming even less synthetic and more "purely" analytic over time.) Latin, which is highly synthetic, uses affixes and inflections to convey the same information that Chinese does with syntax. Because Latin words are quite (though not totally) self-contained, an intelligible Latin sentence can be made from elements that are arranged almost arbitrarily. Latin has a complex affixation and simple syntax, whereas Chinese has the opposite.

== Education ==
Prescriptive grammar is taught in primary and secondary school. The term "grammar school" historically referred to a school (attached to a cathedral or monastery) that teaches Latin grammar to future priests and monks. It originally referred to a school that taught students how to read, scan, interpret, and declaim Greek and Latin poets (including Homer, Virgil, Euripides, and others). These should not be mistaken for the related, albeit distinct, modern British grammar schools.

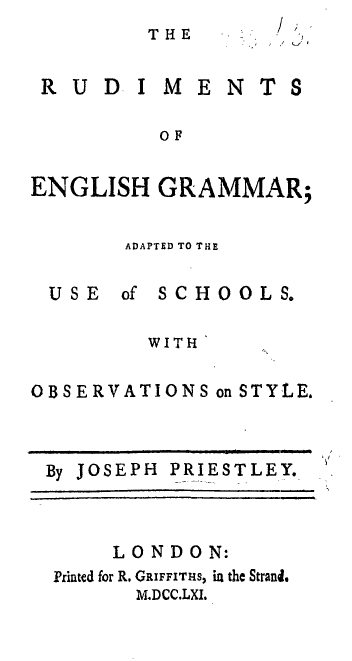
Title page of Joseph Priestley's Rudiments of English Grammar (1761)

A standard language is a dialect that is promoted above other dialects in writing, education, and, broadly speaking, in the public sphere; it contrasts with vernacular dialects, which may be the objects of study in academic, descriptive linguistics but which are rarely taught prescriptively. The standardized "first language" taught in primary education may be subject to political controversy because it may sometimes establish a standard defining nationality or ethnicity.

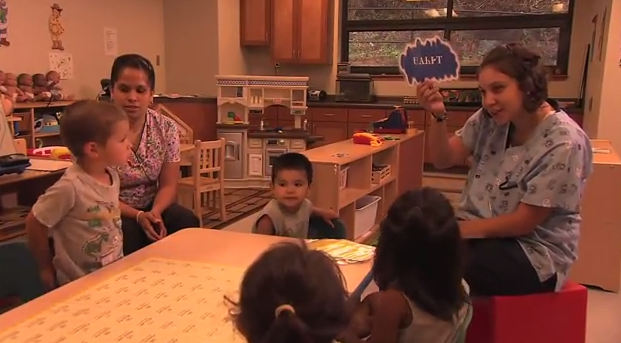
Cherokee language instruction at Kituwah Academy

Recently, efforts have begun to update grammar instruction in primary and secondary education. The main focus has been to prevent the use of outdated prescriptive rules in favor of setting norms based on earlier descriptive research and to change perceptions about the relative "correctness" of prescribed standard forms in comparison to non-standard dialects. A series of metastudies have found that the explicit teaching of grammatical parts of speech and syntax has little or no effect on the improvement of student writing quality in elementary school, middle school or high school; other methods of writing instruction had far greater positive effect, including strategy instruction, collaborative writing, summary writing, process instruction, sentence combining and inquiry projects.

The preeminence of Parisian French has reigned largely unchallenged throughout the history of modern French literature. Standard Italian is based on the speech of Florence rather than the capital because of its influence on early literature. Likewise, standard Spanish is not based on the speech of Madrid but on that of educated speakers from more northern areas such as Castile and León (see Gramática de la lengua castellana). In Argentina and Uruguay the Spanish standard is based on the local dialects of Buenos Aires and Montevideo (Rioplatense Spanish). Portuguese has, for now, two official standards, Brazilian Portuguese and European Portuguese.

The Serbian variant of Serbo-Croatian is likewise divided; Serbia and the Republika Srpska of Bosnia and Herzegovina use their own distinct normative subvarieties, with differences in yat reflexes. The existence and codification of a distinct Montenegrin standard is a matter of controversy, some treat Montenegrin as a separate standard lect, and some think that it should be considered another form of Serbian.

Norwegian has two standards, Bokmål and Nynorsk, the choice between which is subject to controversy: Each Norwegian municipality can either declare one as its official language or it can remain "language neutral". Nynorsk is backed by 27 percent of municipalities. The main language used in primary schools, chosen by referendum within the local school district, normally follows the official language of its municipality. Standard German emerged from the standardized chancellery use of High German in the 16th and 17th centuries. Until about 1800, it was almost exclusively a written language, but now it is so widely spoken that most of the former German dialects are nearly extinct.

Standard Chinese has official status as the standard spoken form of the Chinese language in the People's Republic of China (PRC), the Republic of China (ROC), and the Republic of Singapore. Pronunciation of Standard Chinese is based on the local accent of Mandarin Chinese from Luanping, Chengde in Hebei Province near Beijing, while grammar and syntax are based on modern vernacular written Chinese.

Modern Standard Arabic is directly based on Classical Arabic, the language of the Qur'an. The Hindustani language has two standards, Hindi and Urdu.

In the United States, the Society for the Promotion of Good Grammar designated 4 March as National Grammar Day in 2008.

Grammar instructions also differs between first-language (L1) and second-language (L2) learners, especially in academic writing. First-language (L1) are those composing in their native language, while second-language (L2) writers are writing in language they learned after childhood. Research shows that L2 learners face additional challenges when revising grammar, as they must manage both language acquisition and writing development at the same time. According to Ester Odilia Breuer, revision in L2 writing is cognitively demanding and occurs not only after writing, but also during the planning and drafting stages. She argues that L2 writers often reorganize ideas and revise structure while composing, unlike L1 writers who may rely more on intuition and automatic grammar use.

=== Grammar improvement for second language users ===
Second language writing can be complicated because it requires learners to possess rhetorical abilities, cognitive abilities, and grammatical abilities. Viewing grammar as a means for designing text and making meaning can improve the overall quality of writing. Based on this "writing as design" principle, writers continuously attend to their word choices, as these choices function as essential resources for achieving rhetorical purposes. With a focus on writing as design, grammar instruction is framed as context-based rather than taught as a set of isolated rules. In this framework, writing tutors foster writers' critical thinking, inquiry, agency, and rhetorical awareness rather than focusing solely on grammar correction. Grammar then becomes an improvisational act, as well as seeing mistakes and collaboration as inevitable paths for language fluency and confidence. Grammar also creates opportunities for writers to engage with the complexity of language and to consider how grammatical choices interact with style, identity, and rhetorical purposes.

Regarding the improvement of grammatical accuracy, self-editing has been identified as an effective strategy in both online and face-to-face tutoring sessions. To strengthen writers' ability to edit their own work independently, it is beneficial to identify common errors and record them in an "error log" for future revision. Through self-editing, writers can independently discover and correct syntactic, lexical, and grammatical problems. As a result, this skill can remarkably enhance writers' confidence in their writing abilities.

== See also ==
- Ambiguous grammar
- Harmonic grammar
- Higher order grammar (HOG)
- Linguistic error
- Linguistic typology
- Model-theoretic grammar
- Paragrammatism
- Speech error
- Tagmeme
- Usage (language)
