= Linguistics wars =

20th-century dispute among American linguists

The linguistics wars were extended disputes among American theoretical linguists that occurred mostly during the 1960s and 1970s, stemming from a disagreement between Noam Chomsky and several of his associates and students. In today's terms, the positions differ in how they view the relation between semantics and syntax. The debates started in 1967 when linguists Paul Postal, John R. Ross, George Lakoff, and James D. McCawley—self-dubbed the "Four Horsemen of the Apocalypse"—proposed to treat deep structures as meaning rather than syntactic objects. While Chomsky and other generative grammarians argued that meaning is driven by an underlying syntax, generative semanticists posited that syntax is shaped by an underlying meaning. This intellectual divergence led to two competing frameworks in interpretive semantics (following Chomsky) and generative semantics (following the "Horsemen").

Eventually, generative semantics spawned a different linguistic paradigm, known as cognitive linguistics, a linguistic theory that correlates learning of languages to other cognitive abilities such as memorization, perception, and categorization, while descendants of interpretive semantics continue in the guise of formal semantics.

== Background ==
In 1957, Noam Chomsky (b. 1928) published Syntactic Structures, his first influential work. The ideas in Syntactic Structures were a significant departure from the dominant paradigm among linguists at the time, championed by Leonard Bloomfield (1887–1949). The Bloomfieldian approach focused on smaller linguistic units such as morphemes and phones, and had little to say about how these units were organized into larger structures such as phrases and sentences. By contrast, syntax was the central empirical concern of Syntactic Structures, which modeled grammar as sets of rules that procedurally generate all and only the sentences of a given language. This approach is referred to as transformational grammar. Moreover, Chomsky criticized Bloomfieldians as being "[t]axonomic linguists", mere collectors and cataloguers of language. Early work in generative grammar attempted to go beyond mere description of the data and identify the fundamental underlying principles of language. According to Chomsky, semantic components created the underlying structure of a given linguistic sequence, whereas phonological components formed its surface-level structure. This left the problem of ‘meaning’ in linguistic analysis unanswered.

Chomsky's Aspects of the Theory of Syntax (1965) developed his theory further by introducing the concepts of deep structure and surface structure, which were influenced by previous scholarship. First, Chomsky drew from Ferdinand de Saussure (1857–1913), specifically his dichotomy of langue (the native knowledge of a language) versus parole (the actual use of language). Secondly, Louis Hjelmslev (1899–1965) later argued parole is observable and can be defined as the arrangement of speech, whereas langue comprises the systems within actual speech that underpin its lexicon and grammar. Aspects of the Theory of Syntax also addressed the issue of meaning by endorsing the Katz–Postal hypothesis, which holds that transformations do not affect meaning, and are therefore “semantically transparent”. This attempted to introduce notions of semantics to descriptions of syntax. Chomsky's endorsement resulted in further exploration of the relation between syntax and semantics, creating the environment for the emergence of generative semantics.

== Dispute ==
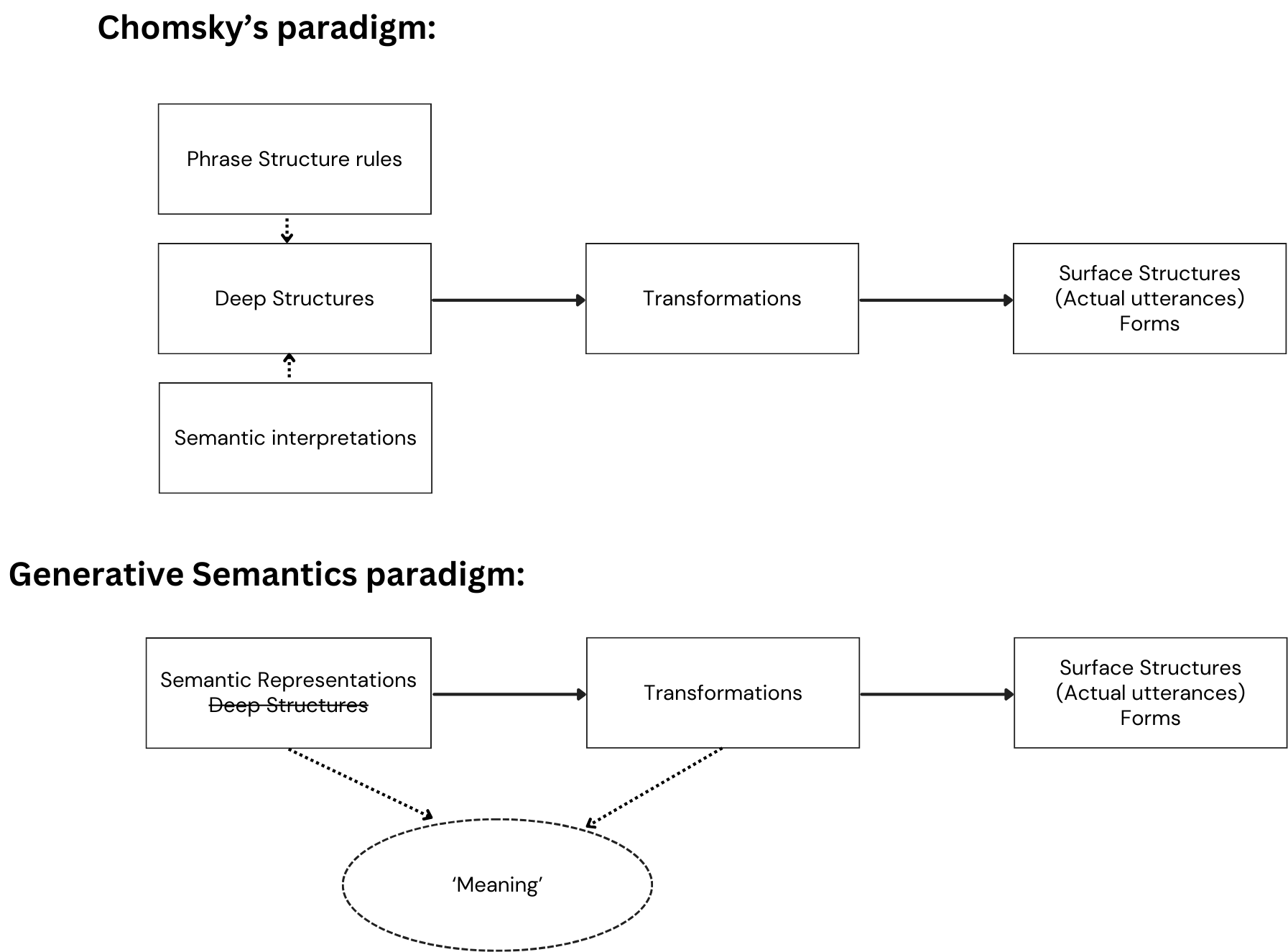
The divergence in the generative semantics and Aspects' paradigms (Adapted from Harris, 2022)

The point of disagreement between interpretive semantics, following Chomsky's paradigm, and generative semantics, known at the time as Abstract Syntax, was the degree of ‘abstractness’ of deep structure. This refers to the distance between deep structures and the surface structure.

In Chomsky’s paradigm, deep structure is syntactic, pertaining to the organization of linguistic items, and independent of meaning—or at least meaning is not explicitly addressed. The deep structure and the transformations that link the deep structure to the surface structure are essential for describing the structural composition of linguistic items, i.e. for syntactic description. Transformations apply to and manipulate deep structure but sometimes alter the meaning. Deep structure is thus mainly characterised by its formal features, including (context-free) phrase-structure grammar and lexical insertion point—the point where words enter the derivation. The generative semantics paradigm deviates sharply from this.

=== Generative semantics approach ===
Generative semantics analysis evolved to favor an approach where deep structures reflect meaning directly through semantic features and relations—semantic representations. Thus, the formal characteristics of deep structures are considered insufficient and meaning drives the surface structures. In generative semantics, deep structure is semantic, and necessary for connecting the surface structure with meaning. Transformations apply to deep structures to create different surface structures while preserving meaning.

Generative semantics was inspired by two notions highlighted in Chomsky's Aspects: deep structures determine the semantic representations, and selectional restrictions—rules that govern what follows and precedes words in a sentence—are stated in deep structures. Crucially, these restrictions include the ‘semantic’ nature of the verb eat which necessitates that it should be followed by something edible. Generative semanticists initially misinterpreted Chomsky’s ideas about the relation between semantic representation and selectional restrictions. In their understanding, the deep structure of eat comprises entirely of its meaning representation. They used the arguments of selectional restrictions to draw a direct and bilateral relation between meaning and surface structures, where semantic representations are mapped onto surface structures, thereby conflating the two levels of semantic representation and deep structures.

Generative semanticists eventually abandoned deep structures altogether for the semantic representation.

Generative semantics' model
deep structure:

[AGENT]  boy,[ACTION] hitting, [PATIENT]the ball

Transformation active:

The boy hit the ball.

Chomsky's model
deep structure:

S ((NP the boy) (VP [hit]) (NP the ball))

Transformation passive:

The ball was hit by the boy.

Generative semanticists used arguments such as category-changing transformations in which simple paraphrase clouds alter the syntactic categories yet the meaning is unchanged, solidifying the Katz-Postal hypothesis which postulates a transparent nature of transformations. These category-changing transformations exist in inchoative and causative clauses which share the same underlying structures similar to their stative clause as evident in the sentences below.

Inchoative:

The door opened.

Causative:

He opened the door.

The underlying structure is similar to the stative clause:

The door is open.

Generative semanticists used this argument, first suggested by George Lakoff in his dissertation, to cement the idea that the underlying meaning (The door is OPEN) drives two different surface structures (Inchoative/causative), not the other way around.

==== Generative semantics and logical form ====
The level of semantic representation in the generative semantic analyses resembled the logical form; therefore, the derivation of a sentence is the direct mapping of semantics, meaning, and logic onto the surface structure. Thus all aspects of meaning are represented in the full parse of the sentence. Generative semanticists have claimed that the semantic deep structure is generated in a universal manner similar to those of Predicate logic, thereby reducing the syntactic categories to just three: S (= proposition), NP (= argument), and V (= predicate). In this analysis adjectives, negatives, and auxiliaries are reduced to one category which is Verb, and the other forms are derived transformationally.

==== Lexical decomposition ====
Lexical decomposition was used to analyse the semantic implication inherent to words and identify how these would become realised in a sentence. An analysis would work out the semantic and syntactic relation between lexical items and their atomic parts. For example, in the word kill the analysis would reveal that it has atomic bits such as CAUSE and BECOME and NOT and ALIVE, where the S is the cause of the process, NP becomes, NOT modifies ALIVE, etc. Words with similar lexical readings may share a lexical base. The lexical base of dead would be NOT ALIVE, and there are lexical extensions such as kill or die with similar readings. The word die comes from NOT ALIVE with the transformation inchoative (BECOME NOT ALIVE), and kill has the same lexical base NOT ALIVE with transformation causative (CAUSE TO BECOME NOT ALIVE). Generative semantic's case for lexical decomposition is that it simplifies the projections rules necessary for transformations. Rather than entering the word kill directly in the deep structure, thereby creating a new ‘syntactic’ deep structure, it would be considered as sharing the same ‘semantic’ deep structure with dead, NOT ALIVE.

Using this case of lexical decomposition, McCawley proposed a new rule—predicate raising—where lexical items can enter at any point of the derivation process rather than just in the deep structures. This argument by McCawley undermined deep structures as lexical insertion points: some transformations—predicate-raising—needed to be applied before the inserting the lexical items—lexical insertion point—in the derivation. Indeed, predicate-raising collects the predicate parts—abstract verbs—into the meaning complexes—words.

These arguments were used to conclude that it made no theoretical sense to have syntactic deep structures as a separate level and that semantic representations, features, and relations should be mapped directly onto the surface structure. Additionally, generative semanticists hold that any level of structure that comes between the semantic representation and surface structure requires empirical justification.

=== Interpretivist critique of generative semantics ===
Chomsky and others conducted a number of linguistic arguments that are designed to demonstrate that generative semantics not only did not offer something new but was misconceived and misguided. In response to these challenges, Chomsky conducted a series of lectures and papers, known later as Remarks, which culminated in what was later known as the "interpretivist program". This program aimed to establish syntax as an independent level in the linguistic analysis—autonomous syntax—with independent rules, while the meaning of the syntactic structure follows from ‘interpretive’ rules applied to the syntactic structures. This approach retains the formal characteristics of deep structure as context-free phrase-structure grammar. Chomsky also criticized the Predicate-raising rule of McCawley for being an upside-down interpretive rule.

==== Lexicalism and deverbal nouns ====
The generative semanticist’s analysis—lexical decomposition—holds that words refuse and refusal would belong to the same category refuse. In Remarks Chomsky argued for the limitation of transformations and the separation of lexical entries for semantically related words as some nominalizations have distinct meanings. Chomsky argued that words such as marry, marriage; revolve, revolution should not be treated as derived from their verb forms as revolution has broader scope, so does marry. These nouns—which are known as deverbal nouns—should exist separately in the lexicon. This approach was later known as lexicalism. This posited also that nominalization should happen in the lexicon, not in the deep structure or through a transformation operating on it, thereby limiting the power of transformations.

For example:

(a) John is eager to please.

(b) John's eagerness to please.

(c) John is easy to please.

(d) *John's easiness to please.

Generative semantics would hold that (b) is a nominalisation of the phrase in (a), hence a nominalisation in deep structure. Yet the (d) sentence shows some distributional differences is not accounted for if the deverbal nouns are to be derived transformationally.

Another point made by Chomsky against generative semantics was the structural similarity deverbal nouns have with noun phrases, which suggests that it has its own independent internal structure. In the example, proofs (ostensibly a nominalisation of prove) functions like portraits, a regular noun phrase.

(a) Several of John's proofs of the theorem.

(b) Several of John's portraits of the dean.

Remarks contributed to what Chomsky terms the Extended Standard Theory, which he thought of as an extension to Aspects. To many linguists, the relation between transformations and semantics in the generative semantics was the natural progression of Aspects.

==== Lexical decomposition ====
The interpretive semanticist Jerry Fodor also criticized generative semanticists’ approach to lexical decomposition in which the word kill is derived from CAUSE TO BECOME NOT ALIVE. Fodor considers a sentence such as:

(a) Putin caused Litvinenko to die on Wednesday by having him poisoned three weeks earlier.

(b) * Putin killed Litvinenko on Wednesday by having him poisoned three weeks earlier.

In these sentences (a) kill is derived from (b) caused to die, however, (a) is correct and causes no discrepancies but (b) is not. The temporal qualifier “Wednesday by having him poisoned three weeks earlier” contradicts the order of events implied by killed. This suggests that lexical decomposition could fail to account for causal and temporal intricacies required for accurate semantic interpretation.

==== Cases for formalism in underlying structures ====
===== Coreference =====
Under the generative semanticist coreference relations in a sentence such as “Harry thinks he should win the prize” are analyzed in the deep structure as “Harry thinks Harry should win the prize”, then transformations happen to replace Harry with he in the surface structure. But this approach was criticized for creating an infinite loop of embedding—with he—in the deep structure “The man who shows he deserves it will get the prize he desires.”. Thus, the interpretivists considered he as a base component and the formal structure independent of semantics. Finding the correct antecedents is achieved through interpretive rules.

===== Transformations and meaning =====
Transformations are not fully accounted for in the Katz-Postal hypothesis which underlies the generative semantics paradigm. The interpretivists argued that passive transformations do alter meaning in sentences with qualifiers such as every. In the sentences

(1) Everyone in the room knows two languages.

(2) Two languages are known by everyone in the room.

Chomsky analyzed these two sentences as semantically different despite being only derivational pairs; he observed that the first sentence might imply that everyone knows two different languages, while the second sentence implies that everyone in the room knows the same two languages. This argument was used to retain the formal characteristics of deep structures as transformation movements are not accounted for through semantic relations, but rather formal ones. The existence of an independent level of syntactic structure to which transformations apply is evidence of formalism.

Generative semanticist George Lakoff accounted for this discrepancy resulting from passive transformations by claiming that the theoretical sentence (3) from which (2) is derived does not share the same underlying structure as (1). The underlying structure of (1) starts with everyone, while (3) would start with two, with the relative position of these quantifiers determining the scope of the meaning. Additionally, generative semanticists provided the “Quantifier lowering” rule. This rule moves quantifiers to the last position in the surface structures. In the theoretical sentence (3), everyone is lowered, highlighting that it is the same two languages are known by everyone. In (1), on the other hand, the quantifier two is lowered, maintaining that it is everyone who knows two (potentially different) languages. Lakoff proposed another rule which he termed the “global derivational constraint” to account for the fact that a sentence such as (2) could not be derived from the same structure as (1).

=== Empirical challenges in the paradigm ===
Generative semantics faced challenges in its empirical confirmation. Analyses in interpretive semantics involve phrase-structure rules and transformations that are innately codified according to Aspects, drawing on Chomsky’s ideas of innate faculty in the human brain which process languages. By contrast, generative analyses contained hypotheses concerning factors like the intent of speakers and the denotation and entailment of sentences. Its lack of explicit rules, formulas, and underlying structures made its predictions difficult to compare and evaluate compared to those of interpretive semantics. Additionally, the generative framework was criticized for introducing irregularities without justification: the attempt to bridge syntax and semantics blurred the lines between these domains. Critics argued that the approach created more problems than it solved. These limitations led to the decline of generative semantics.

== Aftermath ==
After the protracted debates and with the decline of generative semantics, its key figures pursued various paths. George Lakoff moved on to cognitive linguistics, which explores the cognitive domain and the relation between language and mental processes. Meanwhile, in the late 90s Chomsky switched his attention to a more universal program of generative grammar, the minimalist program, which does not claim to offer a comprehensive theory of language acquisition and use. Postal eventually rejected the idea of generative semantics and adopted a mathematical/logical approach to studying natural languages, discarding aspects of cognition altogether and emphasizing grammaticality. John R. Ross ventured to more literary-orientated endeavors such as poetry, though he maintained his transformationalist essence as his name existed in many of the Chomskyan works. As for McCawley, he continued following the tradition of generative semantics until his unfortunate death in 1999. He was known for his malleable approach to linguistic theory, employing both Extended Standard Theory and generative semantics elements.

== Books ==
A first systematic description of the linguistics wars is the chapter with this title in Frederick Newmeyer's book Linguistic Theory in America, which appeared in 1980.

The Linguistics Wars is the title of a 1993 book by Randy A. Harris that closely chronicles the dispute among Chomsky and other significant individuals (George Lakoff and Paul Postal, among others) and also highlights how certain theories evolved and which of their important features have influenced modern-day linguistic theories. A second edition was published in 2022, in which Harris traces several important 21st century linguistic developments such as construction grammar, cognitive linguistics and frame semantics, all emerging out of generative semantics. The second edition also argues that Chomsky's minimalist program has significant homologies with early generative semantics.

Ideology and Linguistic Theory, by John A. Goldsmith and Geoffrey J. Huck, also explores that history, with detailed theoretical discussion and observed history of the times, including memoirs/interviews with Ray Jackendoff, Lakoff, Postal, and Ross. The chapter "What happened to Generative Semantics" explores the aftermath of the dispute and the schools of thought or practice that could be seen as the successors to generative semantics.

== See also ==
- Ray C. Dougherty
- Neurolinguistics
- Decoding Chomsky
