= Deep structure and surface structure =

Architecture of early generative grammar

Deep structure and surface structure (also D-structure and S-structure although those abbreviated forms are sometimes used with distinct meanings) are concepts used in linguistics, specifically in the study of syntax in the Chomskyan tradition of transformational generative grammar.

The deep structure of a linguistic expression is a theoretical construct that seeks to unify several related structures. For example, the sentences "Pat loves Chris" and "Chris is loved by Pat" mean roughly the same thing and use similar words. Some linguists, Chomsky in particular, have tried to account for this similarity by positing that these two sentences are distinct surface forms that derive from a common (or very similar) deep structure.

== Origin ==
Chomsky coined and popularized the terms "deep structure" and "surface structure" in the early 1960s. American linguist Sydney Lamb wrote in 1975 that Chomsky "probably [borrowed] the term from Hockett". American linguist Charles Hockett first used the dichotomous pair "deep grammar" vs "surface grammar" in his 1958 book titled A Course in Modern Linguistics. Chomsky first referred to these Hockettian concepts in his 1962 paper The Logical Basis of Linguistic Theory (later published as Current Issues in Linguistic Theory in 1964). In it Chomsky noted that "the difference between observational and descriptive adequacy is related to the distinction drawn by Hockett (1958) between 'surface grammar' and 'deep grammar', and he is unquestionably correct in noting that modern linguistics is largely confined in scope to the former." The phrases 'depth grammar' and 'surface grammar' had been used by Ludwig Wittgenstein to denote the same ideas in his Philosophical Investigations (1953).

== In Chomskyan linguistics ==
In early transformational syntax, deep structures are derivation trees of a context-free language. These trees are then transformed by a sequence of tree rewriting operations ("transformations") into surface structures. The terminal yield of a surface structure tree, the surface form, is then predicted to be a grammatical sentence of the language being studied. The role and significance of deep structure changed a great deal as Chomsky developed his theories, and since the mid-1990s deep structure no longer features at all (see minimalist program).

It is tempting to regard deep structures as representing meanings and surface structures as representing sentences that express those meanings, but this is not the concept of deep structure which Chomsky favoured. Rather, a sentence more closely corresponds to a deep structure paired with the surface structure derived from it, with an additional phonetic form obtained from processing of the surface structure. It has been variously suggested that the interpretation of a sentence is determined by its deep structure alone, by a combination of its deep and surface structures, or by some other level of representation altogether (logical form), as argued in 1977 by Chomsky's student Robert May. Chomsky may have tentatively entertained the first of these ideas in the early 1960s, but quickly moved away from it to the second, and finally to the third. Throughout the 1960s and 1970s, the generative semantics movement put up a vigorous defence of the first option, sparking an acrimonious debate, the "Linguistics Wars".

Chomsky noted in his early years that by dividing deep structures from surface structures, one could understand "slip of the tongue" moments (where someone says something that they did not intend) as instances where deep structures do not translate into the intended surface structure.

== Extension to other fields ==
The appeal of the deep structure concept soon led people from unrelated fields (architecture, music, politics, and even ritual studies) to use the term to express various concepts in their own work. In common usage, the term is often used as a synonym for universal grammar—the constraints which Chomsky claims govern the overall forms of linguistic expression available to the human species. This is probably due to the importance of deep structure in Chomsky's earlier work on universal grammar, though his concept of universal grammar is logically independent of any particular theoretical construct, including deep structure.

According to Middleton (1990), Schenkerian analysis of music corresponds to the Chomskyan notion of deep structure, applying to a two-level generative structure for melody, harmony, and rhythm, of which the analysis by Lee (1985) of rhythmical structure is an instance. (See also: Chord progression § Blues changes.)

Deep Structure Theory (DST) is a unifying framework in cognitive neuropsychology, developed by Oliver Boxell, that proposes the human mind and its functions, including psychopathology, arise from inherent "deep structure algorithms" and their interactions with the environment. These algorithms describe the compiled electromagnetic oscillatory activity of complex neural circuits and create the abstract mental information that constitutes human experience. DST aims to provide a common, integrated general model for neuropsychology, moving beyond fragmented research to analyze the foundational, shared mechanisms underlying all mental faculties. Boxell builds upon concepts like deep and surface structures from linguistics, as articulated by thinkers like Noam Chomsky, but applies them to the broader neurocognitive functioning of the human brain. DST integrates domain-general conceptual ("Information-Phase," I-Phase) representations with different domain-specific ("Spellout-Phase," S-Phase) representations, and it integrates the representational and real-time processing subsystems, as well as neuropsychology with the underlying dynamic complex systems of neurobiology, biology, chemistry, and quantum electrodynamics.

== See also ==
- Underlying representation
