= The Syntactic Phenomena of English =

English grammar book by James D. McCawley

- Author: James D. McCawley
- Language: English
- Subject: Linguistics; English grammar
- Genre: Nonfiction
- Published: 1988 (1st ed.); 1998 (2nd ed.)
- Publisher: University of Chicago Press
- Publication place: United States
- Pages: 837 (2nd ed.)
- ISBN: 978-0-226-55629-1 (2nd ed.)
- OCLC: 1014850383

The Syntactic Phenomena of English (SPhE (Note: References in this article to SPhE are to the single-volume, second edition (1998).)) is a book by James D. McCawley that describes the syntax of English. It was published by the University of Chicago Press in 1988 (in two volumes), and with revisions (and as a single volume) in 1998.

== Chapters ==
The chapters of the second edition (whose organization is little changed from that of the first (Note: "[T]he chapters of [the second edition] largely match the order of their counterparts in [the first], the only differences in the chapter organization being that I have combined the two chapters on coordination in [the first edition] into a single chapter and have moved the chapters 'Other Types of Nondeclarative Sentences' and 'Discourse Syntax' to earlier locations" (SPhE xi).)) are:

1. Introduction
2. Overview of the scheme of syntactic analysis adopted below
3. Some tests for deep and surface constituent structure
4. Some subject-changing transformations (Note: These include passivizing and extraposition.)
5. Complements
6. Rule interaction
7. Syntactic categories (Note: Not a mere taxonomy of categories (noun, verb, etc), but rather a commentary on the nature of categorization.)
8. Auxiliary verbs
9. Coordination
10. Surface combinatoric rules
11. Anaphora
12. The structure of noun phrases (Note: Including a theory of nominalization.)
13. Relative clauses
14. Interrogative clauses
15. Principles restricting and extending the application of transformations
16. Other types of nondeclarative sentences
17. Negation
18. Scope of quantifiers and negations
19. Adverbs
20. Comparative constructions
21. Discourse syntax
22. Patches and syntactic mimickry (Note: "McCawley explores some ways in which English allows its syntactic structures to be used in a broader class of cases than the rules of the language, understood straightforwardly, appear to allow.")

== Reception ==
In his review of the first edition for Journal of Linguistics, David Lightfoot inferred that the "phenomena" of the title were "elements of [McCawley's] analyses", and examined the description in SPhE of auxiliaries and anaphora, which he found very disappointing:

To a great extent this book could have been written twenty years ago and it is a pity that it wasn't. . . . His book is permeated with parenthetical complaints about unidentified culprits of vulgar sins. It is a grumpy book, which elicits a grumpy response.

Younghee Na's review for Linguistica Atlantica was much warmer. She understood the book not as a reference grammar but rather "primarily meant to be a textbook in syntax courses", and as such, unusual in its detailed exploration of a "vast range of syntactic phenomena in English" – as befitted a book whose preface promised "top billing to the phenomena and second billing to the theory". Nevertheless, thanks to some original thinking by its author, SPhE "will have uses far beyond that of a textbook and will be particularly useful as a reference book in English syntax". Na pointed out that examples of some phenomena, such as anaphora and constituency tests, were unusually rich; also, that McCawley saw discontinuous constituents in a variety of syntactic constructions.

Na was particularly interested in the book's "systematic irregularities of syntax", such as its requirement of a "patch" (Jerry L. Morgan's term) in order to have present-tense verb somehow agree with a subject such as "either two women or one man", or the "vicarious quantification" that leads to the subject of "Most cars are stolen by teenagers" being interpreted as "most cars that are stolen". Na concluded by recommending SPhE as a challenging book for students (and their instructors).

Reviewing the second edition (1998) for the Journal of Logic, Language and Information, Ivana Kruijff-Korbayová noted that it was intended for a two-quarter syntax course, but that its content would probably be excessive even for a year-long course. She suggested that instructors could choose what to use within it, and that it would give students plentiful opportunities for further reading. The first ten chapters, she explained, made up "an intertwined whole", and students should digest them before embarking on the twelve that follow, which "are much less mutually dependent".

Reviewing the second edition for Language, Andrew Rosta first said that the book defied likely interpretations of its title, and that it instead

offers an in-depth and wide-ranging treatise on the nature of English syntax according to [McCawley's] model. . . . The book is not about his theory per se but rather about how his theory applies to English. It is necessary to get to grips with his theory in order to adequately grasp his analysis of English syntax, but, unlike the analyses, the theory itself is not argued for.

This, Rosta regretted, was likely to deter many potential readers; but the difficulties they would face would be outweighed by "the opportunity to watch [McCawley's] mind construct an analytical edifice that sheds so much light on so many broad areas of English syntax and on so many of its nooks and crannies too" – and construct it with "brio".

Rosta was surprised, however, by the way the text ignored so much of what was, at the time of revision, more or less taken for granted by syntacticians: "[McCawley's] model is something of a Shangri-La, almost blissfully untouched by time, or a remarkable living fossil, coelacanth-like, a descendant of generative semantics (GS) robustly defying the forces of academic natural selection." Rosta surmised that a certain degree of isolation might have hindered McCawley from showing drafts to other linguists who could have pointed out areas that would have benefited from further explanation; but he praises McCawley's acumen and concludes that "it's hard to see how anyone with an interest in English syntax could fail to find this book an exhilarating and rewarding read."

In an obituary published in Historiographia Linguistica, John Goldsmith and Jerrold Sadock wrote:

Any number of the topics [McCawley] takes up in detail in [SPhE] are either not represented at all, or are mentioned in a sentence or two in other recent works that purport to be formal grammars of English. Of special concern to McCawley in his syntactic work was the nature of grammatical categories, the proper treatment of discontinuity, and the cyclic principle.

Mario Brdar describes SPhE as:

a reference full of details about English grammar that have always wanted more attention from linguists. Along with his logic book (Everything that linguists have always wanted to know about logic . . .), this was no doubt among [McCawley's] most enduring contributions to the pool of classical linguistic literature. They were eclectic references that synthesize the most significant findings by himself and other linguists about semantics, syntax, pragmatics, and the philosophy of language during his career. Both books were constructive proof that generative grammar can be used to produce sane descriptive statements about language.
