= Roger Gibson =

American philosopher (1944–2015)

Roger F. Gibson Jr.
- Born: February 21, 1944; St. Louis, Missouri, United States
- Died: September 30, 2015 (aged 71); Reston, Virginia, United States
- Spouse: Sharon Gibson
- Children: Georgia Gibson

Education
- Education: Northeast Missouri State College, currently Truman State University (B.A., 1971). University of Missouri (M.A., 1973, Ph.D., 1977).

Philosophical work
- Era: 20th-century philosophy
- Region: Western philosophy
- School: Analytic philosophy
- Institutions: Washington University in St. Louis
- Main interests: Epistemology; philosophy of language
- Notable works: (1) Gibson, Roger F. (1982). The Philosophy of W. V. Quine: An Expository Essay. University Presses of Florida. ISBN 978-0-8130-0707-6. (2) Gibson, Roger F. (1988). Enlightened Empiricism: An Examination of W. V. Quine's Theory of Knowledge. University Presses of South Florida. ISBN 978-0-8130-0886-8.

Roger Fletcher Gibson Jr. (February 21, 1944 – September 30, 2015) was an American philosopher specializing in epistemology and the philosophy of language. He was best known as a leading exponent of the philosophy of W. V. Quine.

== Biography ==
Gibson was born in St. Louis, Missouri, to Roger Fletcher Gibson Sr. and Virginia Irene Melton. He spent his formative years moving throughout the country, eventually coming to live with his maternal grandparents. Gibson joined the United States Marine Corps out of high school and volunteered for duty in Vietnam. He served in Saigon from October 1965 to October 1966. He considered his military service one of his greatest achievements.

Gibson embarked upon the pursuit of philosophy as an academic career in 1967 upon the completion of his military service. He was ready to resume his education that year, having served in the United States Marine Corps immediately after high school, between 1962 and 1966, attached for part of that time as aide to General Westmoreland during the height of the Vietnam War. He enrolled in Northeast Missouri State College, currently Truman State University, where he graduated in 1971 with a B.A. in philosophy.

Encouraged by his undergraduate philosophy professors, Henry Smits and Kay Blair, both holding doctorates from the University of Missouri, he applied to their graduate program in philosophy and was admitted in the fall of 1971. He developed a budding affinity for analytic philosophy while at the University of Missouri, receiving an M.A. in 1973 and a Ph.D. in 1977. His experience there was shaped by Arthur Berndtson, Donald Oliver, and John Kultgen, among others, the latter also directing his dissertation.

Gibson served the discipline both as a leader and as a scholar. His first notable leadership role was as President of the Central States Philosophical Association in 1983–1984. His scholarly initiatives attracted attention from the outset, earning him grants from the National Endowment for the Humanities in 1984–1985 and 1988. His academic career flourished at Washington University in St. Louis, where he began teaching in 1985. He served as the Chair of the Department of Philosophy in the College of Arts and Sciences at Washington University in St. Louis between 1989 and 1999. His many contributions to the department included spearheading the creation of the school's Philosophy-Neuroscience-Psychology (PNP) Program in 1993, playing a prominent role in securing grants for that purpose from the James S. McDonnell Foundation.

Gibson's formal areas of expertise were epistemology and the philosophy of language, with further competence in the philosophy of science. While publishing extensively in these areas, his overall engagement with philosophy was broad and deep enough for publication in other specialties as well, including those as diverse as logic and ethics. Most of his works, even on the rare occasion he turned to ethics, tend to revolve around the philosophy of W. V. Quine. Those that do are all well-received (as are the few that do not), earning him a reputation as one of the world's leading exponents of Quine.

That reputation is the culmination of an early and steadfast interest in Quine. His master's thesis (1973) and doctoral dissertation (1977) are both on Quine. His persistent appeals to the Harvard philosopher for permission to sit in on his classes at Harvard University, while himself still enrolled as a graduate student at the University of Missouri, are something of an academic legend, related by Quine himself both in his autobiography, The Time of My Life: An Autobiography (1985), and in his foreword to Gibson's first book, The Philosophy of W. V. Quine: An Expository Essay (1982). The permission granted paved the way for some of the most influential secondary literature on Quine, including two monographs, three edited volumes, and numerous articles. Gibson's two monographs — The Philosophy of W. V. Quine: An Expository Essay (1982) and Enlightened Empiricism: An Examination of W. V. Quine's Theory of Knowledge (1988) — are held in especially high regard.

His personal output on Quine was complemented by his ability to bring out the same in others. Attesting to his dedication to the enrichment of Quine studies, he organized, together with Robert B. Barrett Jr., a conference (April 9–13, 1988) bringing together at Washington University in St. Louis the world's foremost authorities on the subject, including Quine himself, as well as Donald Davidson, Dagfinn Føllesdal, Susan Haack, Gilbert Harman, Jaakko Hintikka, Jerrold Katz, Barry Stroud, and Joseph S. Ullian. The proceedings were published in 1990 as Perspectives on Quine.

A festschrift organized in his honor in 2008 brought together eminent analytic philosophers from around the world: Robert B. Barrett Jr.; Lars Bergström; Richard Creath; David Henderson; Terence Horgan; Ernest Lepore; Pete Mandik; Alex Orenstein; Kenneth Shockley; J. Robert Thompson; Josefa Toribio; Joseph S. Ullian; Josh Weisberg; Chase B. Wrenn.

Gibson died at the age of 71 in Reston, Virginia, after a long battle with Parkinson's and Parkinson's dementia.

== Selected publications ==
=== Books ===
Date	Publication
1982	Gibson, Roger F. Jr. (1982). The Philosophy of W. V. Quine: An Expository Essay. Tampa: University Presses of Florida. ISBN 978-0-8130-0707-6.
1988	Gibson, Roger F. Jr. (1988). Enlightened Empiricism: An Examination of W. V. Quine's Theory of Knowledge. Tampa: University Presses of Florida. ISBN 978-0-8130-0886-8.
1990	Barrett, Robert B. Jr.; Gibson, Roger F. Jr., eds. (1990). Perspectives on Quine. Philosophers and Their Critics No. 6. Oxford: Blackwell Publishing. ISBN 978-0-6311-6135-6.
2004	Gibson, Roger F. Jr., ed. (2004). The Cambridge Companion to Quine. Cambridge Companions to Philosophy. Cambridge: Cambridge University Press. ISBN 978-0-5216-3056-6.
2004	Gibson, Roger F. Jr., ed. (2004). Quintessence: Basic Readings from the Philosophy of W. V. Quine. Cambridge: Harvard University Press. ISBN 978-0-6740-1048-2.

=== Articles ===
Date	Publication (Gibson as sole author)
1980	"Are There Really Two Quines?" Erkenntnis: An International Journal of Scientific Philosophy 15:3 (November 1980): 349–370. ISSN 0165-0106. doi: 10.1007/BF02070844.
1983	"A New Perspective on Quine." Journal of Thought 18:2 (Summer 1983): 73–84. ISSN 0022-5231.
1984	"On an Inconsistency in Thomson's Abortion Argument." Philosophical Studies 46:1 (July 1984): 131–139. ISSN 0031-8116. doi: 10.1007/BF00353495.
1986	"Corporations, Persons, and Moral Responsibility." Journal of Thought 21:2 (Summer 1986): 17–26. ISSN 0022-5231.
1986	"Quine's Dilemma." Synthese: An International Journal for Epistemology, Methodology and Philosophy of Science 69:1 (October 1986): 27–39. ISSN 0039-7857. doi: 10.1007/BF01988285.
1986	"Translation, Physics, and Facts of the Matter." Chapter 5 of The Philosophy of W. V. Quine (pp. 139–154, with Quine's reply in 155–157). Edited by Lewis Edwin Hahn and Paul Arthur Schilpp. The Library of Living Philosophers 18. La Salle: Open Court Publishing Company, 1986. Pagination identical in second, expanded edition, 1998. ISBN 978-0-8126-9012-5.
1986	"Logic as a Core Curriculum Subject: Its Case as an Alternative to Mathematics." Journal of Philosophy of Education 20:1 (July 1986): 21–37. ISSN 1467-9752. doi: 10.1111/j.1467-9752.1986.tb00107.x.
1987	"A Rose by Another Name: A Rejoinder to Professors Hoffman and Frederick." Journal of Thought 22:1 (Spring 1987): 7–11. ISSN 0022-5231.
1987	"Quine on Naturalism and Epistemology." Erkenntnis: An International Journal of Scientific Philosophy 27:1 (July 1987): 57–78. ISSN 0165-0106. doi: 10.1007/BF00169711.
1988	"Flanagan on Quinean Ethics." Ethics 98:3 (April 1988): 534–540. (Flanagan's response follows in pp. 541–550 of the same volume.) ISSN 0014-1704. doi: 10.1086/292970.
1989	"Stroud on Naturalized Epistemology." Metaphilosophy 20:1 (January 1989): 1–11. ISSN 0026-1068. doi: 10.1111/j.1467-9973.1989.tb00402.x.
1991	"More on Quine's Dilemma of Underdetermination." Dialectica: International Journal of Philosophy of Knowledge 45:1 (March 1991): 59–66. ISSN 0012-2017. doi: 10.1111/j.1746-8361.1991.tb00977.x.
1992	"The Key to Interpreting Quine." The Southern Journal of Philosophy 30:4 (Winter 1992): 17–30. ISSN 0038-4283. doi: 10.1111/j.2041-6962.1992.tb00644.x.
1993	"Katz on Indeterminacy and the Proto-Theory." Chapter 16 of Naturalism and Normativity. Edited by Enrique Villanueva. Philosophical Issues 4 (1993): 167–173. (Reply by Katz appears as chapter 17 of the same volume: pp. 174–179). Atascadero: Ridgeview Publishing Company. ISSN 1533-6077. doi: 10.2307/1522838. Reprinted as a review of Jerrold J. Katz's The Metaphysics of Meaning (Cambridge: The MIT Press, 1990): Philosophy and Phenomenological Research 54:1 (March 1994): 133–138. ISSN 0031-8205. doi: 10.2307/2108360.
1993	"Two Conceptions of Philosophy." Grazer Philosophische Studien: Internationale Zeitschrift für Analytische Philosophie 44 (1993): 25–39. ISSN 0165-9227. doi: 10.5840/gps19934431.
1994	"Quine and Davidson: Two Naturalized Epistemologists." In Symposium on Quine's Philosophy. Edited by Dagfinn Føllesdal and Alastair Hannay. Inquiry: An Interdisciplinary Journal of Philosophy (Special Issue) 37:4 (1994): 449–463. ISSN 0020-174X. doi: 10.1080/00201749408602367.
1995	"A Note on Boghossian's Master Argument." Chapter 19 of Content. Edited by Enrique Villanueva. Philosophical Issues 6 (1995): 222–226. ISSN 1533-6077. doi: 10.2307/1523043.
1996	"McDowell's Direct Realism and Platonic Naturalism." Chapter 25 of Perception. Edited by Enrique Villanueva. Philosophical Issues 7 (1996): 275–281. (Reply by McDowell appears as the first part of chapter 26 of the same volume: pp. 283–285). Atascadero: Ridgeview Publishing Company. ISSN 1533-6077. doi: 10.2307/1522912.
1996	"Quine, Wittgenstein and Holism." Chapter 4 of Wittgenstein and Quine (pp. 80–96). Edited by Robert L. Arrington and Hans-Johann Glock. London: Routledge, 1996. ISBN 978-0-4153-4904-8. Reprinted in Knowledge, Language and Logic: Questions for Quine (pp. 81–93). Essays presented to Professor Quine in celebration of his ninetieth birthday. Edited by Alex Orenstein and Petr Kotatko. Boston Studies in the Philosophy of Science No. 210. Dordrecht: Kluwer Academic Publishers, 2000. ISBN 978-1-4020-0253-3. doi: 10.1007/978-94-011-3933-5 7.
1996	"Quine's Behaviorism." Chapter 7 of The Philosophy of Psychology (pp. 96–107). Edited by William O'Donohue and Richard F. Kitchener. London: Sage Publications, 1996. ISBN 978-0-7619-5305-0. doi: 10.4135/9781446279168.n7. Reprinted as chapter 15 of the Handbook of Behaviorism (pp. 419–436). Edited by William O'Donohue and Richard F. Kitchener. San Diego: Academic Press, 1999. ISBN 978-0-1252-4190-8. doi: 10.1016/b978-012524190-8/50016-4.
1998	"Quine's Philosophy: A Brief Sketch." Chapter 25 of The Philosophy of W. V. Quine (pp. 667–683, with Quine's reply in 684–685). Second, expanded edition. Edited by Lewis Edwin Hahn and Paul Arthur Schilpp. The Library of Living Philosophers 18. La Salle: Open Court Publishing Company, 1998. Gibson's "Sketch" is not in the original edition of 1986. ISBN 978-0-8126-9371-3.
2002	"Remembering Willard van Orman Quine (1908–2000)." Journal for General Philosophy of Science 33:2 (2002): 213–229. ISSN 0925-4560. doi: 10.1023/A:1022460321692.
2003	"Quine." Chapter 29 of The World's Great Philosophers (pp. 253–260). Edited by Robert L. Arrington. Oxford: Blackwell Publishing, 2003. ISBN 978-0-6312-3145-5. doi: 10.1002/9780470693704.ch29.
2004	"Quine's Behaviorism cum Empiricism." Chapter 7 of The Cambridge Companion to Quine (pp. 181–199). Edited by Roger F. Gibson Jr. Cambridge Companions to Philosophy. Cambridge: Cambridge University Press, 2004. Abridged and corrected version of Gibson's "Quine's Behaviorism" (1996 [= 1999]). ISBN 978-0-5216-3056-6. doi: 10.1017/CCOL0521630568.008.
2004	"Willard Van Orman Quine." In The Cambridge Companion to Quine (pp. 1–18). Edited by Roger F. Gibson Jr. Cambridge Companions to Philosophy. Cambridge: Cambridge University Press, 2004. ISBN 978-0-5216-3056-6. doi: 10.1017/CCOL0521630568.001.
2006	"W. V. Quine." Chapter 9 of A Companion to Pragmatism (pp. 101–107). Edited by John R. Shook and Joseph Margolis. Oxford: Blackwell Publishing, 2006. ISBN 978-1-4051-1621-3. doi: 10.1002/9780470997079.ch10.

=== Reviews ===
Date	Publication (Gibson as sole author)
1989	Review of Christopher Hookway's Quine: Language, Experience and Reality (Stanford: Stanford University Press, 1988). British Journal for the Philosophy of Science 40:4 (December 1989): 557–567. ISSN 0007-0882. doi: 10.1093/bjps/40.4.557.
1989	Review of Paul Gochet's Ascent to Truth: A Critical Examination of Quine's Philosophy (Munich: Philosophia Verlag, 1986). Metaphilosophy 20:2 (April 1989): 163–168. ISSN 0026-1068. doi: 10.1111/j.1467-9973.1989.tb00416.x.
1989	Review of Robert Feleppa's Convention, Translation, and Understanding: Philosophical Problems in the Comparative Study of Culture (Albany: State University of New York Press, 1988). Southwest Philosophy Review 5:2 (July 1989) 83–90. ISSN 0897-2346. doi: 10.5840/swphilreview19895226.
1992	Review of Mark Sacks's The World We Found: The Limits of Ontological Talk (La Salle: Open Court, 1989). The Philosophical Review 101:3 (July 1992): 673–675. ISSN 0031-8108. doi: 10.2307/2186076.
1994	Review of Peter Lipton's Inference to the Best Explanation (Philosophical Issues in Science Series. New York: Routledge, 1991). The Review of Metaphysics 48:2 (December 1994): 417–418. ISSN 0034-6632.
1995	Review of Rudolf Fara and Michael Fara's In Conversation: W. V. Quine (Audiovisual series originally issued on VHS tape. London: Philosophy in Britain, Philosophy International, Centre for the Philosophy of the Natural and Social Sciences, The London School of Economics and Political Science, 1994.) Mind (New Series) 104:415 (July 1995): 637–645. ISSN 0026-4423. doi: 10.1093/mind/104.415.637.
