= Ray C. Dougherty =

American linguist (born 1940)

Ray Cordell Dougherty
- Born: 1941 (age 84–85); New York City, U.S.

Academic background
- Education: MIT, Dartmouth College
- Influences: Noam Chomsky; Charles Sanders Peirce; René Descartes; Konrad Lorenz

Academic work
- School or tradition: Generative linguistics
- Institutions: New York University
- Main interests: Biolinguistics; Computational linguistics

Ray C. Dougherty (born 1940) is an American linguist and was a member of the Arts and Science faculty at New York University until 2014 (retired). He received his bachelor's and master's degrees in engineering from Dartmouth College in the early 1960s and his Ph.D. in linguistics from the Massachusetts Institute of Technology in 1968. At MIT, Dougherty was one of the first students of Noam Chomsky, working in the field of transformational grammar. During the Linguistics Wars of the 1970s, Dougherty was a critic of the generative semantics movement. Specializing in computational linguistics, Dougherty has published several books and articles on the subject.

In recent years, Dougherty has become interested in the study of biolinguistics, focusing on the role of the cochlea in the evolution of animal communication systems and naturalistic applications of information theory.

Dougherty has made numerous contributions to advancing the study of semiotics at New York University.

== Select publications ==
- "A grammar of coordinate conjoined structures, Part I," 1970, Language 46: 850.
- "A grammar of coordinate conjoined structures, Part II," 1971, Language 47: 298.
- "Generative semantics methods: A Bloomfieldian counterrevolution," 1974, International Journal of Dravidian Linguistics 3: 255.
- "Harris and Chomsky at the Syntax-Semantics Boundary," 1975, In D. Hockney (ed.), Contemporary Research In Philosophical Logic and Linguistic Semantics, (Dordrecht: Reidel).
- "Einstein and Chomsky on scientific methodology," 1976, Linguistics 167: 5.
- "An Information-Theoretical Model of Grammar Reproduction," 1979, Proceedings of the Annual Meeting of the Linguistic Society of America.
- "Current Views of Language and Grammar," 1983, In F. Machlup & U. Mansfield (eds.), The Study of Information: Interdisciplinary Messages, (New York: Wiley).
- Digital Signal Processing, 1984 (Englewood Cliffs, NJ: Prentice-Hall) (with William D. Stanley and Gary R. Dougherty).
- "Language learning machines," 1987, Semiotic Inquiry 8: 27.
- Natural Language Computing: An English Generative Grammar in Prolog, 1994 (Hillsdale, NJ: Lawrence Erlbaum Press).
- "Strings, Lists and Intonation in Garden Path Sentences: Can it, Plan it, or planet?" 2004, In C. Leclère, É. Laporte, M. Piot, & M. Silberztein (eds.), Syntax, Lexis & Lexicon-Grammar: Papers in Honour of Maurice Gross, (Philadelphia: John Benjamins).
- "Information Theory Defines 'Mathematically Conceivable Communication System'," 2007, Proceedings of the Biolinguistic Investigations Conference, Santo Domingo.
- "A Minimalist Theory of Auditory Interfaces: Why the Larynx Descended," 2007, Proceedings of the Biolinguistic Investigations Conference, Santo Domingo (with Garrett Neske).

== See also ==
- Research, Pre 2000
- Research, Recent
