= Noriko Akatsuka =

Japanese American scholar (1937–2016)

Noriko M. Akatsuka (March 17, 1937 – October 17, 2016) was a Japanese-born American scholar of Japanese language and Japanese, Korean and English linguistics, particularly known for her research on conditionals and epistemic modality.

== Early life and education ==
She was born in 1937 in Kyoto, Japan, to Chikara and Shizuko Shiga, who died when she was a child, leaving her to be raised by her grandmother and then adopted by Takashi and Kayoko Akatsuka. She was educated at Rakuhoku High School and then studied English literature at Doshisha University (1955–59).

She moved to the U.S. in the 1960s for her post-graduate education at the University of Illinois, Urbana-Champaign, receiving her PhD in linguistics in 1972.

== Career and research ==
Akatsuka taught at the University of Chicago before moving to the University of California, Los Angeles (UCLA) in 1981, where she laid the foundations for the Asian linguistics graduate program of the Department for Asian Languages and Cultures and also developed the existing Japanese-language undergraduate teaching.

Her research in the early 1970s included work on syntax in Japanese, including reflexivization and passives; it was still being cited at the time of her death. Her 1977 paper "What is the 'emphatic root transformation' phenomenon?" discusses inverted constructions in English, and is an early example of her focus on the critical importance of the speaker. According to Naomi Hanaoka McGloin, the background to all of Akatsuka's work is "a quest for an answer to a basic question, 'What makes language human?'"

From the mid-1970s, her research focused on the use of conditionals in Japanese, Korean and English. According to Patricia Mayes, Akatsuka's work shows that "conditionals do not convey static, objective generalizations about the world; rather, they express the speaker's dynamic, subjective evaluation of what s/he knows about the world and how s/he feels about it, given the situation and context at the time of speaking." Susan Strauss writes in an obituary that the areas of conditionals and epistemic modality are "nearly synonymous" with Akatsuka, "most notably the terms the epistemic scale and the desirability hypothesis".

Akatsuka learned Korean as an adult in the US and became interested in comparisons between Korean, Japanese and English in the 1990s, in collaboration with Sung-Ock Sohn, Patricia Clancy and Strauss.

Akatsuka was consulting editor for Linguistics for nearly two decades. She published a book, Modaritii to hatsuwakooi (Modality and Speech Acts) in 1998. With Clancy, Hajime Hoji and Hyo-Sang Lee, she founded the Japanese and Korean Linguistics Circle in the mid-1980s. Akatsuka organised the first Japanese/Korean Linguistics Conference at UCLA in 1990. She arranged for the proceedings of the ongoing conference series to be published by the Center for the Study of Language and Information at Stanford University, and was editor or co-editor of four volumes. Aspects of Linguistics: In Honor of Noriko Akatsuka was published in 2007.

== Personal life ==
Akatsuka met the linguist James D. McCawley in 1971, while a post-doctoral student, and they married on December 16 of that year. They divorced in December 1978.

Akatsuka died on October 17, 2016, in Santa Monica, California. A celebration of her contributions was organized at the Japanese/Korean Linguistics Conference in 2017.

== Publications ==
Edited books

- Noriko Akatsuka, Susan Strauss, Bernard Comrie (eds). Japanese/Korean Linguistics, Vol. 10
- Noriko Akatsuka, Hajime Hoji, Shoichi Iwasaki, Sung-Ock Sohn, Susan Strauss (eds). Japanese/Korean Linguistics, Vol. 7
- Noriko Akatsuka, Shoichi Iwasaki, Susan Strauss (eds). Japanese/Korean Linguistics, Vol. 5
- Noriko Akatsuka (ed.). Japanese/Korean Linguistics, Vol. 4

Research papers

- Noriko Akatsuka (1985). Conditionals and the epistemic scale. Language 61: 625–639 doi:10.2307/414388 (Akatsuka's most highly cited research paper, with 334 citations according to Google Scholar)
