= Donka Farkas =

Linguist

- Education: University of Bucharest, The University of Chicago
- Scientific career
- Fields: Linguistics, Semantics, Pragmatics
- Workplaces: UCSC
- Thesis: Intensional Descriptions and the Romance Subjunctive Mood
- Doctoral advisor: James D. McCawley

Donka Farkas (born April 3, 1952) is a Romanian-American linguist, Professor Emerita of Linguistics at the University of California, Santa Cruz.

== Academic career ==
Donka Farkas received her PhD in Linguistics from the University of Chicago in 1981. Her dissertation, titled Intensional Descriptions and the Romance Subjunctive Mood, was supervised by James D. McCawley.

She joined the linguistics faculty of University of California-Santa Cruz in 1991, where she remained until her retirement in 2019. Over the course of her career, she supervised the PhDs of several students who went on to have distinguished careers of their own.

She specializes in formal semantics and pragmatics, and her widely-cited work is often grounded in data from Romance languages and Hungarian. She has made particularly important contributions to the semantics of (in)definiteness (Brasoveanu & Farkas 2011); specificity (Farkas 2002); subjunctive mood (Farkas 1985); and sentence types, including relationships between questions and their answers (Farkas & Kim 2010; Farkas & Roelofsen 2017).

== Honors and recognition ==
In 1985, Farkas's dissertation appeared in Garland Publishing's prestigious Outstanding Dissertations in Linguistics series.

In 2013, Farkas was recognized with the John Dizikes Teaching Award in Humanities, which honors one recipient each year for outstanding teaching in the humanities at the University of California, Santa Cruz.

== Selected publications ==
Brasoveanu, Adrian; Farkas, Donka. 2011. How indefinites choose their scope. Linguistics and Philosophy 34, 1-55.

Farkas, Donka. 1985. Intensional Descriptions and the Romance Subjunctive Mood. Outstanding Dissertations in Linguistics. Garland Publishing.

Farkas, Donka. 2002. Specificity distinctions. Journal of Semantics 19, 213-243.

Farkas, Donka; Bruce, Kim. 2010. On reacting to assertions and polar questions. Journal of Semantics 27, 81-118.

Farkas, Donka; Roelofsen, Floris. 2017. Division of labor in the interpretation of declaratives and interrogatives. Journal of Semantics 34, 237-289.
