= Linguistics in education =

Linguistics in education refers to a small but growing field of linguistics which advocates a greater use of linguistic theory and methods, such as the analytical and critical reflection on language, in primary and secondary education.

== Background ==
Due to changes in national standards for K-12 education in the United States during the 1960s, grammar was largely dropped from English courses. The belief was that direct grammar instruction was not required for improved instruction in writing. Despite more recent research that has shown the positive effects of grammar instruction, the attitude that it is unnecessary persists today.

== Challenges ==
Because grammar has not been taught in many years, generations of teachers were never exposed to its direct instruction. Thus, even though many wish to teach it in their classrooms, they do not find that they have adequate knowledge on the subject. Unfortunately, this often perpetuates linguistic stereotypes that can sometimes be discriminatory to speakers of nonstandard language varieties. Another issue is that the curriculum for teachers is already very broad, especially in comparison to other college students, so requiring further courses for would-be teachers is rather unpopular. The same problem exists in the K-12 classroom which already have difficult time constraints on their current curriculum. To add grammar to an already full curriculum is extremely difficult.

== Benefits ==
Studies of how grammar and other linguistic theory can be incorporated into K-12 classrooms have been highly successful both in improving students' conscious knowledge of grammar and changing attitudes about non-standard English dialects. There is evidence that grammar instruction can be beneficial to students' writing such that replacing writing or vocabulary instruction with grammar can actually be a more productive use of class time. Recent studies also highlight the benefits of integrating linguistic theory into foreign language teaching.

== Current theory ==
Linguists have also been involved in this field in attempts to change misconceptions about language. One common example is the definition of nouns. Traditionally a noun is defined as a "person, place, or thing". While this definition captures much of what nouns are it does not incorporate all possible definitions and uses. For example, mental concepts such as "belief" or "idea" are also nouns but do not neatly fit the traditional definition. This can be especially difficult for children to understand. A more comprehensive definition seeks to describe nouns through their features and uses. However this definition requires the teacher to have greater knowledge of English syntax.
