= Johannes Clajus =

Saxon pastor and schoolmaster

Johannes Clajus (1535–1592) was a Saxon pastor and schoolmaster. He wrote the first grammar of the German language, Grammatica Germanicae lingua, published in 1578.

== Life ==
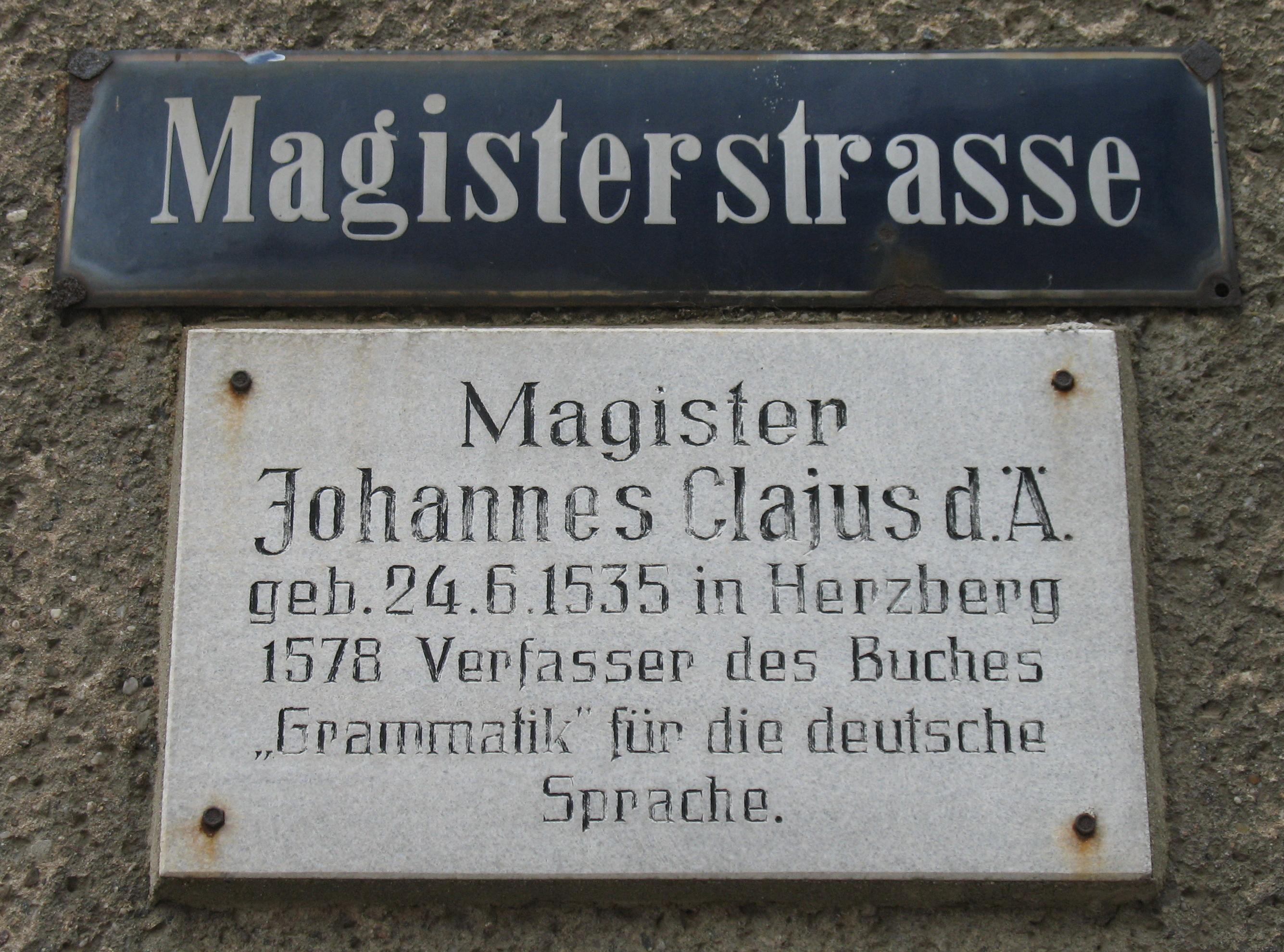

Clajus grew up in poor circumstances. His father Anton died early, so his mother Katharina Schickrath initially became his point of reference. Through supporters, he was able to attend the Princely School in Grimma and studied at the University of Leipzig from 1555 to 1559. In order to support himself, he took unsatisfactory teaching positions in Herzberg from 1559 to 1568, in Goldberg from 1559 to 1568, and in Frankenstein in 1569. However, he wanted to devote himself more to theology, so he went to the University of Wittenberg and initially obtained the Magister degree in 1572. Subsequently, he took over the rectorate of the school in Nordhausen from 1570 to 1572 and was able to obtain a parish position in Bendeleben in 1573.

Here he had the time to deal with the grammar of the German language. This led to his work Grammatica Germanicae Linguae in 1578, which, alongside Albert Ölinger's and Laurentius Albertus' works, paved the way for "written German grammar" in an independent achievement. The template for this was Martin Luther's translation of the Bible in the revised edition of 1545. In doing so, he seems to have oriented himself on the division of Latin grammar into Orthographia, Prosodia, Etymologia, and Syntaxis and presented his explanations based on phonetics and morphology.

The abundant examples of his rules prove the existence of older vocabulary that receded more and more in the 18th century. They thus become important word-historical testimonies. A brief verse theory concludes the grammar. The grammar was published more than ten times until 1720, mostly in Central German printing locations. This shows the preferred distribution area of the work, which, however, has not remained unknown in the Low German area and on Upper German soil. It may have served for direct teaching well into the 17th century. Justus Georg Schottel (1612–1676) and German grammars after him until the 18th century build on Clajus.

Johannes Clajus was married three times. The first marriage to Anna Storke († 1576) took place on July 18, 1558. After her death, he married Anna Martha Pisiquin († 1587) on September 16, 1576, and subsequently Elisabeth Anna Martha. From these marriages, six children were born from his first marriage, three children from his second marriage, and one daughter from his third marriage. His tombstone can be found in the village church of Bendeleben.
