= James D. McCawley =

Scottish-American linguist (1938–1999)

James David McCawley
- Born: March 30, 1938; Glasgow, Scotland
- Died: April 10, 1999 (aged 61); Chicago
- Spouse: Noriko M. Akatsuka (m. 1971; div. 1978)

Academic background
- Education: Massachusetts Institute of Technology, University of Chicago
- Thesis: The accentual system of standard Japanese (1965)
- Doctoral advisor: Noam Chomsky
- Influences: Noam Chomsky, W.V.O. Quine

Academic work
- Institutions: University of Chicago
- Notable students: Donka Farkas; Georgia M. Green; Salikoko Mufwene; William O'Grady

James David McCawley (March 30, 1938 – April 10, 1999) was a Scottish-American linguist, author, and professor in the Department of Linguistics at the University of Chicago.

== Biography ==
McCawley was born James Quillan McCawley, Jr. to Dr. Monica Bateman McCawley (b. 1901), a physician and surgeon, and James Quillan McCawley (b. 1899), a businessman. In 1939 his father and two brothers moved to Toronto and founded a roofing company, but his mother remained in Glasgow with the children until after World War II. James Sr. moved to New York City and finally Chicago, where the family joined him. It was on his arrival in America that young McCawley changed his name to James David McCawley, dropping the "Junior."

He skipped several grades in school, entered the University of Chicago in 1954 at the age of 16, and soon gained early admission to the graduate school, from which he received an M.S. in mathematics in 1958. He then received a Fulbright fellowship to study mathematics and logic in 1959–60 at Westfälische Wilhelms-Universität in Münster. During this time he became disillusioned with mathematics, and after sitting in on a linguistics course taught by Eric Hamp, he became more and more interested in the subject and began taking language courses; on his return to America, he applied to the new linguistics graduate program at MIT and was accepted, spending the next three years as a member of the first Ph.D. class there. He worked as a research assistant with the Mechanical Translation group in 1962 and 1963, and in 1965 he received his doctorate for a dissertation under Noam Chomsky on The accentual system of modern standard Japanese. By this time he had already returned to the University of Chicago as assistant professor of linguistics.

McCawley worked at the Department of Linguistics at the University of Chicago from 1964 until his sudden and unexpected death from a heart attack in 1999. At the time of his passing, he was working on two books, a collection of his recent articles and a text on the relation of philosophy of science to linguistics.

His interests encompassed syntax, semantics, pragmatics, and phonology. He is perhaps best known within linguistics for his work in generative semantics. Outside academia he is noted for The Eater's Guide to Chinese Characters, his guidebook to reading Chinese restaurant menus without previous knowledge of Chinese. He had an interest in libertarian politics and once ran (unsuccessfully) for election to state office on the Libertarian ticket.

Under the pseudonym "Quang Phúc Đông" (supposedly a linguist at the fictitious South Hanoi Institute of Technology), McCawley wrote a paper on "English sentences without overt grammatical subject." A French translation of this paper was published in 1969. McCawley also wrote about "pornolinguistics" and "scatolinguistics".

== Books ==
- The Phonological Component of a Grammar of Japanese. The Hague: Mouton, 1968. (Revised version of PhD thesis, The accentual system of standard Japanese.)
- Grammar and Meaning: Papers on Syntactic and Semantic Topics. Tokyo: Taishukan, 1973. Reprint. New York: Academic Press, 1976. ISBN 0-12-482450-1
- Notes from the Linguistic Underground. (Syntax and Semantics, vol. 7.) New York: Academic Press, 1976. ISBN 0-12-613507-X
- Adverbs, Vowels, and Other Objects of Wonder. University of Chicago Press, 1979. ISBN 0-226-55615-8
- Everything that Linguists Have Always Wanted to Know About Logic (but were Ashamed to Ask). University of Chicago Press, 1981. ISBN 0-226-55618-2 Blackwell, 1982. ISBN 0-631-12614-7 (hardback), ISBN 0-631-12644-9 (paperback) / 2nd ed. University of Chicago Press, 1993. ISBN 0-226-55611-5
- Thirty Million Theories of Grammar. University of Chicago Press, 1982. ISBN 0-226-55619-0
- The Eater's Guide to Chinese Characters. University of Chicago Press, 1984. ISBN 0-226-55591-7 Reprint. University of Chicago Press, 2004. ISBN 0-226-55592-5
- The Syntactic Phenomena of English. University of Chicago Press, 1988. 2 vols. Vol. 1 ISBN 0-226-55624-7, Vol. 2 ISBN 0-226-55626-3 / 2nd ed. University of Chicago Press, 1998. ISBN 0-226-55627-1 (hardback) ISBN 0-226-55629-8 (paperback)
- A Linguistic Flea Circus. Bloomington: Indiana University Linguistics Club, 1991.
