= Grammatica Germanicae Linguae =

1578 compendium on the German language

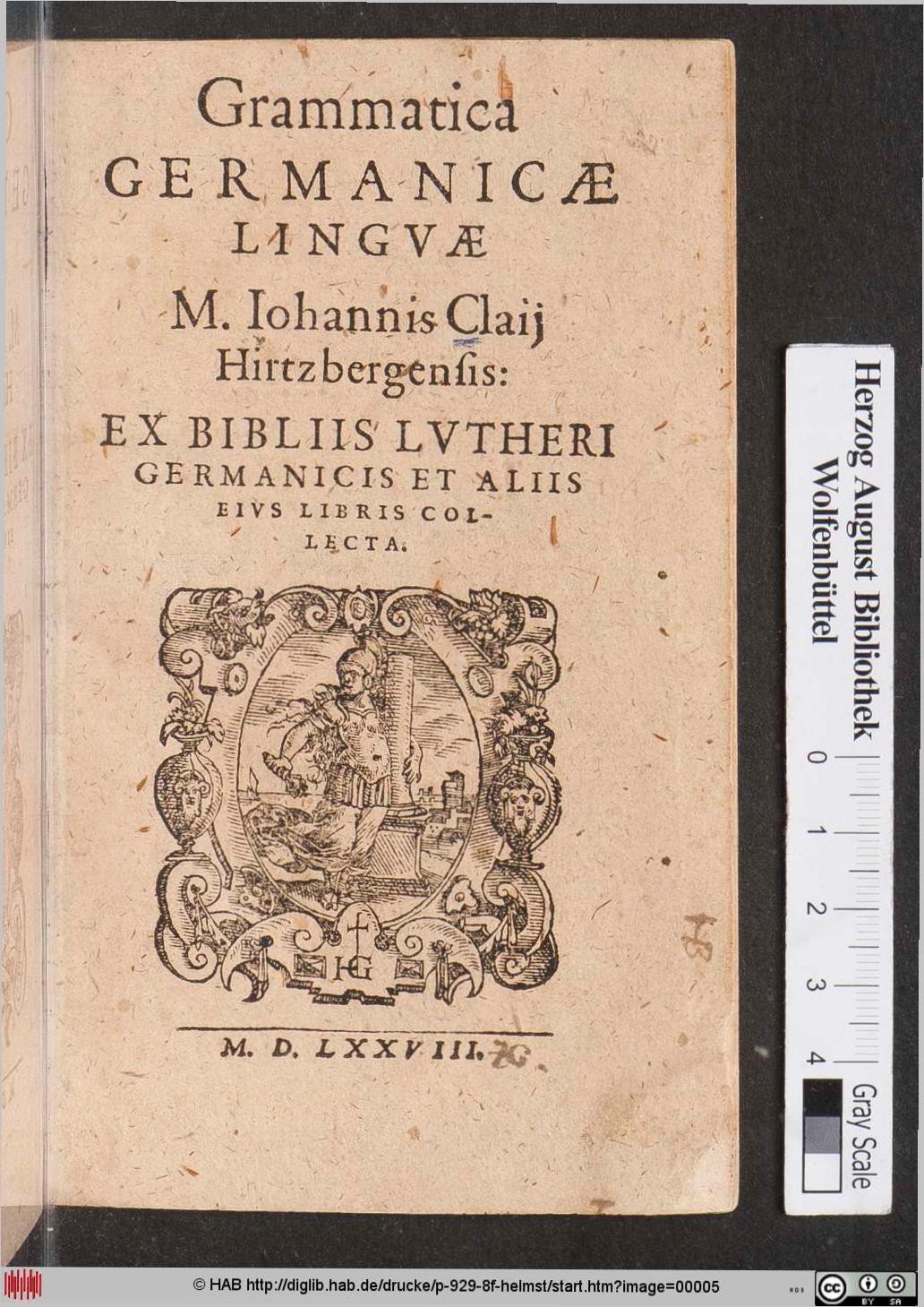
- Author: Johannes Clajus
- Language: Latin, German
- Subject: German language grammar
- Publication date: 1578

Grammatica Germanicae Linguae is a grammar book of the German language written by Johannes Clajus. First published in 1578, it is considered one of the earliest systematic grammar books for the German language. The book was written in Latin and German.

== Contents ==
The Grammatica Germanicae Linguae begins with a brief history of the German language, which places its inception in "the year of the world 1756" after the destruction of the tower of Babel. It is then divided into four sections, each discussing different aspects of German.

1. Orthography, which teaches to write correctly.
2. Prosody, which teaches to pronounce correctly.
3. Etymology, which teaches to inflect correctly, and to form one thing from another.
4. Syntax, which teaches to correctly connect words with each other.

== Significance ==
The significance of Clajus's Grammatica Germanicae Linguae lies in its role as one of the earliest and most thorough descriptions of the German language. It has served as a valuable resource for linguists and historians studying the development and standardization of German.

In addition, Clajus's work has cultural and historical significance. It provides insights into the intellectual and cultural life of the German-speaking regions during the late Renaissance and the Reformation, a period of significant social, religious, and political change.

== Editions ==
- 1578
- 1587 (2nd)
- 1592 (3rd)
- 1604 (4th)
- 1610 (5th)
- 1617 (6th)
- 1625 (7th)
- 1651 (8th)
- 1677 (9th)
- 1689 (10th)
- 1720 (11th)
