= Jerrold Katz =

American philosopher (1932–2002)

- Born: Jerrold Jacob Katz; 14 July 1932; Washington, D.C.
- Died: 7 February 2002 (aged 69); New York

Education
- Education: Princeton University

Philosophical work
- Era: Contemporary philosophy
- Region: Western philosophy
- School: Analytic
- Main interests: Philosophy of language
- Notable ideas: Generative semantics Realistic rationalism Analyticity entails apriority

Jerrold Jacob Katz (14 July 1932 – 7 February 2002) was an American philosopher and linguist.

== Biography ==
After receiving a PhD in philosophy from Princeton University in 1960, Katz became a research associate in linguistics at the Massachusetts Institute of Technology in 1961. He was appointed assistant professor of philosophy there in 1963, and became professor in 1969. From 1975 until his death, he was Distinguished Professor of Philosophy and Linguistics at the City University of New York.

Within linguistics, Katz is best known for his theory of semantics in generative grammar, which he refers to as the autonomous theory of sense (ATS). Katz was a staunch defender of rationalism (although not in a Cartesian/Fregean sense) and the metaphysical import of "essences". He argued extensively against the dominance of empiricism. Katz also argued, against W. V. O. Quine, that the analytic–synthetic distinction could be founded on syntactical features of sentences.

== Works ==
- Katz, J. J. & Fodor, J. A. (1963). The structure of a semantic theory. Language, 39(2), Apr–Jun, 170–210.
- The Philosophy of Language (1966)
- The Underlying Reality of Language and Its Philosophical Import (1971)
- Language and other Abstract Objects (1981)
- The Metaphysics of Meaning (1990)
- Realistic Rationalism (2000)
- Sense, Reference, and Philosophy (2004; posthum.)
