= Cecilia Poletto =

Italian linguist (born 1962)

Cecilia Poletto (born 17 August 1962 in Venice) is an Italian linguist who works in the framework of generative grammar. She is professor at the Goethe University Frankfurt as well as part-time professor at the University of Padua.

== Education ==
Poletto received a magister degree in languages and literature from the Ca' Foscari University of Venice in 1986, and subsequently studied linguistics at the University of Geneva. In 1993, she received her doctorate from the University of Padua for a thesis titled The syntax of the subject in Northern Italian dialects.

== Career ==
After her doctorate, Poletto worked as a researcher employed by the Italian National Research Council until 2005, when she took up a position as associate professor at the University of Venice. In 2011, she began her current position as full professor of Romance linguistics at the Goethe University Frankfurt, and since 2016, she has additionally been part-time professor at the University of Padua.

== Honours ==
Poletto has been the recipient of numerous honours and awards. She has led several projects that have received funding from the German Research Foundation. Since 2024, she has been spokesperson for the Collaborative Research Centre Negation in language and beyond.

In 2023, she was elected Member of the Academia Europaea.

== Research ==
Poletto's research has focused primarily on the Romance languages, and particularly Italo-Romance and varieties of French, in both synchronic and diachronic perspective, using the methods of formal syntax, dialectology and historical linguistics. She was one of the founding members of the Syntactic Atlas of Italy (ASIT) project. Linguistic topics she has worked on include verb-second, negation, indefinites, relative clauses, articles, and quantification.

== Selected publications ==
- Poletto, Cecilia. 1993. La sintassi del soggetto nei dialetti italiani settentrionali (The syntax of the subject in Northern Italian dialects). Padua: Unipress. ISBN 9788880980056
- Poletto, Cecilia. 2000. The higher functional field: evidence from Northern Italian dialects. Oxford: Oxford University Press. ISBN 9780198030584
- Benincà, Paola, and Cecilia Poletto. 2004. Topic, focus and V2. In Luigi Rizzi (ed.), The cartography of syntactic structures, vol. 2 The structure of CP and IP, 52–75. Oxford: Oxford University Press. ISBN 9780195159493
- Cornips, Leonie, and Cecilia Poletto. 2005. On standardising syntactic elicitation techniques (part 1). Lingua 115 (7), 939–957. doi:10.1016/j.lingua.2003.11.004
- Poletto, Cecilia. 2014. Word order in Old Italian. Oxford: Oxford University Press. ISBN 9780191635694
