= Terminal yield =

Leave sequence in formal language

In formal language theory, the terminal yield (or fringe) of a tree is the sequence of leaves encountered in an ordered walk of the tree.

Parse trees and/or derivation trees are encountered in the study of phrase structure grammars such as context-free grammars or linear grammars. The leaves of a derivation tree for a formal grammar G are the terminal symbols of that grammar, and the internal nodes the nonterminal or variable symbols. One can read off the corresponding terminal string by performing an ordered tree traversal and recording the terminal symbols in the order they are encountered. The resulting sequence of terminals is a string of the language L(G) generated by the grammar G.
