= Thomas Ernst Josef Wiedemann =

German-British historian

- Born: 14 May 1950
- Died: 28 June 2001 (aged 51)

Academic work
- Discipline: History
- Institutions: University of Bristol; University of Nottingham

Thomas Ernst Josef Wiedemann (14 May 1950 – 28 June 2001) was a German-British historian.

== Life ==
Thomas Wiedemann was born in Karlsruhe on 14 May 1950. His grandmother was Jewish and his father Heinrich had the luck that he wasn't sent to a concentration camp in the East. He was able to hide with a Catholic priest and thereby survive the second World War. After the war the family lived in Baden, but moved to London in 1953. Wiedemann was educated at the Finchley Catholic Grammar School (Wiedemann was a Catholic), whereupon he started a study at the Hertford College of the University of Oxford. After successfully completing his studies, he would continue researching for two more years as a postgraduate. After working for a year (1975–1976) as a researcher at the Warburg Institute (University of London) in London, Wiedemann was recruited in 1976 by the Department of Classical Studies of the University of Bristol. He married Margaret Hunt in 1985, with whom he had two sons and a daughter.

For his research, which would eventually lead to a book entitled 'Adults and Children in the Roman Empire' (1989), he would receive in the Croom Helm Ancient History Prize in 1987 as well as a doctorate from the University of Bristol (although he had not directly aspired to this). He was to remain at this university for nineteen years, where he taught about the history of the Roman Empire from 1992 onwards. He would expand the component of ancient history to the classical studies department. He was also supposed to teach twice at the universities of Freiburg and Eichstatt for six months. In 1995, he made an unexpected move to University of Nottingham as Professor of Latin, where he would also be head of classical studies from 1997 onwards.

== Research ==
Wiedemann's research focused mainly on Roman history and especially on the social aspect and "marginal" groups, as shown by titles such as Greek and Roman Slavery: A Sourcebook (1981), The Roman Household (1991, together with Jane Gardner) and Emperors and Gladiators (1992), as well as his doctorate 'Adults and Children in the Roman Empire'. With his interest in slavery throughout history, he founded the International Centre for the History of Slavery (ICHOS, now called Institute for the Study of Slavery or ISOS) in 1998 in Bristol.

== Works ==
- Greek and Roman Slavery: A Sourcebook, Londen, 1981. ISBN 0415029724
- Thucydides, Thucydides. Book I, ed. E.C. Marchant – introd. bib. T.E.J. Wiedemann, Bristol, 1982 (= 1993). ISBN 0862920272
- Thucydides, Thucydides. Book II, ed. E.C. Marchant – introd. bib. T.E.J. Wiedemann, Bristol, 1982 (= 1993). ISBN 0865160414
- Adults and Children in the Roman Empire, Londen, 1989. ISBN 0415003369
- The Julio-Claudian emperors: AD 14–70, Bristol, 1989. ISBN 1853991171
- – J. Gardner (ed.), The Roman Household: A Sourcebook, Londen, 1991. ISBN 0415044227
- Emperors and Gladiators, London – New York, 1992. ISBN 041500005X
- Cicero and the end of the Roman Republic, Londen, 1994 (= 1995, 2001). ISBN 1853991937
