= Pieter Seuren =

Dutch linguist (1934–2021)

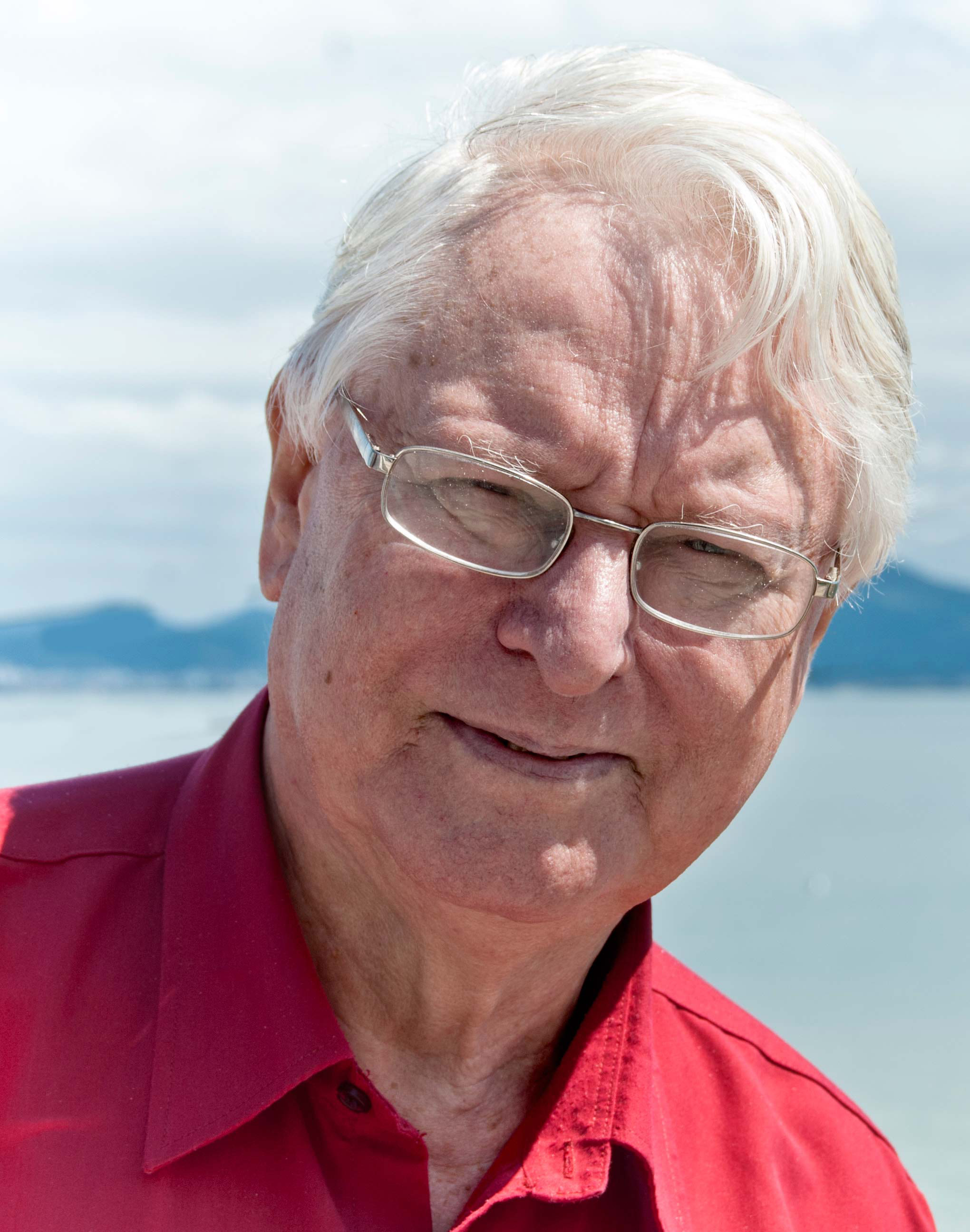
Pieter Seuren

Pieter Albertus Maria Seuren (born 9 July 1934 in Haarlem, died 6 November 2021) was a Dutch linguist, emeritus professor of Linguistics and Philosophy of Language at the Radboud University, Nijmegen, and research fellow at the Max Planck Institute for Psycholinguistics at Nijmegen.

== Biography ==
After finishing the St. Ignatius Gymnasium, Amsterdam, in 1951, he studied linguistics, together with classical languages and ancient history, at Amsterdam University from 1951 till 1958. He then taught Classics at a Junior College in Amsterdam till 1963. For a brief period he studied and worked under the guidance of the Amsterdam logician Evert Beth. This was followed by an assistantship at Groningen University, after which, in 1967, he was appointed as a lecturer in Linguistics at Cambridge University and became a fellow of Darwin College, where he stayed till 1970. In 1969 he obtained his PhD (Operators and Nucleus) at the University of Utrecht. From 1970 till 1974 he was lecturer in Linguistics at Oxford University and a fellow of Magdalen College. From there he moved to Radboud University in Nijmegen as a professor of Philosophy of Language. In 1995 his chair was changed to Theoretical Linguistics.

After his retirement in 1999 he was a research fellow at the Max Planck Institute for Psycholinguistics at Nijmegen. In 1982 he founded the Journal of Semantics. In 1988 he was elected member of the Royal Netherlands Academy of Arts and Sciences. In 1996 he was awarded an honorary doctorate by Glasgow University. During his career he fulfilled visiting professorships in Sydney, Amsterdam, Zürich, Glasgow, Oxford, Penang, Bern, Mannheim, Maceió, Porto Alegre, Leipzig, Vienna, Stellenbosch, Florianópolis.

== Academic work ==
As a linguist, Seuren took an independent position, opposing not only the linguistic ideas of Noam Chomsky but also possible-world semantics and cognitivist linguistics, all of which he considered to be empirically and methodologically inadequate—the former two because they are overformalized and fail to take into account the natural ecological environment of human language, the third because of its ideologically motivated aversion to any explanation involving underlying rule-governed causal mechanisms. In his view, a grammar was an algorithmic top-down rule system transforming logico-semantic mental (propositional) structures into well-formed surface structures (1996). In a wider methodological perspective, he supported the view that in the study of language a balance should be kept between precise but informal analyses and descriptions on the one hand and full formalization on the other: formalize where you can but be content with less formal theorizing when full formalization is (as yet) impossible (2009).

His special fields of research were: the theory of grammar and meaning and their interrelations (1969, 1975, 1996, 2009); the role of logic (especially scope phenomena in language (1969, 1975, 1985, 2010)); the theory of "Semantic Syntax" (1996); the analysis of the notion of meaning (1975, 2009); the theory of semantic presupposition and the trivalent logic required by it (1975, 1985, 2010); the analysis of the context-dependency of sentences in discourse (1985, 2009, 2010); the development of a natural logic on the basis of the natural meanings of logical operators in language (2010).

Besides his work in theoretical linguistics, Seuren is known as a historian of linguistics (1998). From c. 1980 to c. 1995 he took an active interest in Creole languages, in particular the English-based Suriname Creole Sranan, for which he devised a now legally sanctioned orthography, and the French-based Creole of the Indian Ocean island Mauritius. In this context, he co-founded, in 1980, together with Herman Wekker, the IBS (Institute for the Advancement of Surinamese Studies) and the still flourishing Dutch-language periodical Oso (Sranan for 'house').

His seminal publications include:

- Operators and Nucleus. A Contribution to the Theory of Grammar. (diss. Univ. Utrecht) Cambridge University Press, Cambridge, 1969.
- Discourse Semantics. Blackwell, Oxford, 1985.
- Semantic Syntax. Blackwell, Oxford, 1996.
- Western Linguistics. An Historical Introduction. Blackwell, Oxford, 1998.
- A View of Language. Oxford University Press, Oxford, 2001.
- Chomsky's Minimalism. Oxford University Press, New York/Oxford, 2004.
- Language in Cognition. (= Language from Within Vol. I) Oxford University Press, Oxford, 2009.
- The Logic of Language. (= Language from Within Vol. II) Oxford University Press, Oxford, 2010.
- From Whorf to Montague: Explorations in the Theory of Language. Oxford University Press, Oxford, 2013.
- Semantic Syntax. Revised 2nd Edition. Brill, Leiden, 2017.
- Saussure and Sechehaye: Myth and Genius. Brill, Leiden, 2018.
- A Refutation of Positivism in the Philosophy of Mind: Thinking, Reality, and Language. Routledge, New York, 2023.
