= Generative semantics =

Research program in theoretical linguistics

Generative semantics was a research program in theoretical linguistics which held that syntactic structures are computed on the basis of meanings rather than the other way around. Generative semantics developed out of transformational generative grammar in the mid-1960s, but stood in opposition to it. The period in which the two research programs coexisted was marked by intense and often personal clashes now known as the linguistics wars. Its proponents included Haj Ross, Paul Postal, James McCawley, and George Lakoff, who dubbed themselves "The Four Horsemen of the Apocalypse".

Generative semantics is no longer practiced under that name, though many of its central ideas have blossomed in the cognitive linguistics tradition. It is also regarded as a key part of the intellectual heritage of head-driven phrase structure grammar (HPSG) and construction grammar, and some of its insights live on in mainstream generative grammar. Pieter Seuren has developed a semantic syntax which is very close in spirit to the original generative semantics framework, which he played a role in developing.

== Interpretive or generative? ==
The controversy surrounding generative semantics stemmed in part from the competition between two fundamentally different approaches to semantics within transformational generative syntax. In the 1960s, work in the generative tradition assumed that semantics was interpretive in the sense that the meaning of a sentence was computed on the basis of its syntactic structure rather than the other way around. In these approaches, syntactic structures were generated by rules stated in terms of syntactic structure alone, with no reference to meaning. Once generated, these structures would serve as the input to a semantic computation which would output a denotation. This approach captured the relationship between syntactic and semantic patterns, while allowing the syntax to work independently of the semantics, as Chomsky and others had argued for on the basis of empirical observations such as the famous "colorless green ideas sleep furiously" sentence.

The generative semantics framework took the opposite view, positing that syntactic structures are computed on the basis of meanings. In this approach, meanings were generated directly by the grammar as deep structures, and were subsequently transformed into recognizable sentences by transformations. This approach necessitated more complex underlying structures than those proposed by Chomsky, and thus more complex transformations. Despite this additional complexity, the approach was appealing in several respects. First, it offered a powerful mechanism for explaining synonymity. In his initial work in generative syntax, Chomsky motivated transformations using active/passive pairs such as "I hit John" and "John was hit by me", which have different surface forms despite their identical truth conditions. Generative semanticists wanted to account for all cases of synonymity in a similar fashion, which proved to be a challenge given the tools available at the time. Second, the theory had a pleasingly intuitive structure: the form of a sentence was quite literally derived from its meaning via transformations. To some, interpretive semantics seemed rather "clunky" and ad hoc in comparison. This was especially so before the development of trace theory.

Despite its opposition to generative grammar, the generative semantics project operated largely in Chomskyan terms. Most importantly, the generative semanticists, following Chomsky, were opposed to behaviorism and accepted his idea that language is acquired and not learned. Chomsky and Lakoff were united by their opposition to the establishment of formal semantics in the 1970s. The notion that meaning generates grammar is itself old and fundamental to the Port-Royal Grammar (1660), Saussure's Course in General Linguistics (1916), and Tesnière's dependency grammar (1957) among others. By contrast, generative semantics was faced with the problem of explaining the emergence of meaning in neuro-biological rather than social and rational terms. This problem was solved in the 1980s by Lakoff in his version of Cognitive Linguistics, according to which language generates through sensory experience. Thus, engaging with the physical world provides the person with visual, tactile and other sensory input, which crystallizes into language in the form of conceptual metaphors, organizing rational thinking. Such a view of the mind has not been fully approved by neuroscientists.

== Notes ==
There is little agreement concerning the question of whose idea generative semantics was. All of the people mentioned here have been credited with its invention (often by each other).

Strictly speaking, it was not the fact that active/passive pairs are synonymous that motivated the passive transformation, but the fact that active and passive verb forms have the same selectional requirements. For example, the agent of the verb kick (i.e. the thing that's doing the kicking) must be animate whether it is the subject of the active verb (as in "John kicked the ball") or appears in a by phrase after the passive verb ("The ball was kicked by John").

== See also ==
- Cognitive revolution
- Generative linguistics
- Minimal recursion semantics
- Origin of language
- Origin of speech

== Bibliography ==
- Brame, Michael K. (1976). Conjectures and refutations in syntax and semantics. New York: North-Holland Pub. Co. ISBN 0-7204-8604-1.
- Chomsky (1957). Syntactic Structures. The Hague: Mouton.
- Chomsky (1965). Aspects of the Theory of Syntax. Cambridge: The MIT Press.
- Chomsky (1965). Cartesian linguistics. New York: Harper and Row.
- Dougherty, Ray C. (1974). Generative semantics methods: A Bloomfieldian counterrevolution. International Journal of Dravidian Linguistics, 3, 255-286.
- Dougherty, Ray C. (1975). Reply to the critics on the Bloomfieldian counterrevolution. International Journal of Dravidian Linguistics, 4, 249-271.
- Fodor, Jerry A.; & Katz, Jerrold J. (Eds.). (1964). The structure of language. Englewood Cliffs, NJ: Prentice-Hall.
- Harris, Randy Allen. (1995). The linguistics wars. Oxford University Press. ISBN 0-19-509834-X.
- Huck, Geoffrey J.; & Goldsmith, John A. (1995). Ideology and Linguistic Theory: Noam Chomsky and the deep structure debates. New York: Routledge.
- Katz, Jerrold J.; & Fodor, Jerry A. (1964). The structure of a semantic theory. In J. A. Fodor & J. J. Katz (Eds.) (pp. 479–518).
- Katz, Jerrold J.; & Postal, Paul M. (1964). An integrated theory of linguistic descriptions. Cambridge, MA: MIT Press.
- Lakoff, George. (1971). On generative semantics. In D. D. Steinberg & L. A. Jakobovits (Eds.), Semantics: An interdisciplinary reader in philosophy, linguistics and psychology (pp. 232–296). Cambridge: Cambridge University Press.
- Lakoff, George. (1976 [1963]). Toward generative semantics. In J. D. McCawley (Ed.) (pp. 43–61).
- Lakoff, George; & Ross, John R. [Háj]. (1976). Is deep structure necessary?. In J. D. McCawley (Ed.), Syntax and semantics 7 (pp. 159–164).
- McCawley, James D. (1975). Discussion of Ray C. Dougherty's "Generative semantics methods: A Bloomfieldian counterrevolution". International Journal of Dravidian Linguistics, 4, 151-158.
- McCawley, James D. (Ed.). (1976a). Syntax and semantics 7: Notes from the linguistic underground. New York: Academic Press.
- McCawley, James D. (1976b). Grammar and meaning. New York: Academic Press.
- McCawley, James D. (1979). Adverbs, vowels, and other objects of wonder. Chicago: University of Chicago Press.
- Postal, Paul M. (1972). The best theory. In S. Peters (Ed.), Goals of linguistic theory. Englewood Cliffs, NJ: Prentice-Hall.
- Ross, John R. (1967). Constraints on variables in syntax. (Doctoral dissertation, Massachusetts Institute of Technology). Free copy available at http://hdl.handle.net/1721.1/15166. (Published as Ross 1986).
- Ross, John R. (1986). Infinite syntax!. Norwood, NJ: ABLEX, ISBN 0-89391-042-2.
- Ross, John R. [Háj]. (1970). On declarative sentences. In R. A. Jacobs & P. S. Rosenbaum (Eds.), Readings in English transformational grammar (pp. 222–272). Washington: Georgetown University Press.
- Ross, John R. [Háj]. (1972). Doubl-ing. In J. Kimball (Ed.), Syntax and semantics (Vol. 1, pp. 157–186). New York: Seminar Press.
- Seuren, Pieter A. M. (1974). Semantic syntax. Oxford: Oxford University Press. ISBN 0-19-875028-5.
