= Evolutionary psychology of language =

Darwinian adaptation applied to language

Evolutionary psychology of language is the study of the evolutionary history of language as a psychological faculty within the discipline of evolutionary psychology. It makes the assumption that language is the result of a Darwinian adaptation.

There are many competing theories of how language might have evolved, if indeed it is an evolutionary adaptation. They stem from the belief that language development could result from an adaptation, an exaptation, or a by-product. Genetics also influence the study of the evolution of language. It has been speculated that the FOXP2 gene may be what gives humans the ability to develop grammar and syntax.

== Language evolution theories ==
In the debate surrounding the evolutionary psychology of language, three sides emerge: those who believe in language as an adaptation, those who believe it is a by-product of another adaptation, and those who believe it is an exaptation.

=== Adaptation ===
The scientist and psychologists Steven Pinker and Paul Bloom argue that language as a mental faculty shares many likenesses with the complex organs of the body which suggests that, like these organs, language has evolved as an adaptation, since this is the only known mechanism by which such complex organs can develop. The complexity of the mechanisms, the faculty of language and the ability to learn language provides a comparative resource between the psychological evolved traits and the physical evolved traits.

Pinker, though he mostly agrees with Noam Chomsky, a linguist and cognitive scientist, in arguing that the fact that children can learn any human language with no explicit instruction suggests that language, including most of grammar, is basically innate and that it only needs to be activated by interaction, but Pinker and Bloom argue that the organic nature of language strongly suggests that it has an adaptational origin.

=== By-product/Spandrel ===
Chomsky spearheaded the debate on the faculty of language as a cognitive by-product, or spandrel. As a linguist, rather than an evolutionary biologist, his theoretical emphasis was on the infinite capacity of speech and speaking: there are a fixed number of words, but there is an infinite combination of the words. His analysis from this considers that the ability of our cognition to perceive infinite possibilities, or create infinite possibilities, helped give way to the extreme complexity found in our language. Both Chomsky and Gould argue that the complexity of the brain is in itself an adaptation, and language arises from such complexities.

On the issue of whether language is best seen as having evolved as an adaptation or as a by product, the evolutionary biologist W. Tecumseh Fitch, following Stephen J. Gould, argues that it is unwarranted to assume that every aspect of language is an adaptation, or that language as a whole is an adaptation. He criticizes some strands of evolutionary psychology for suggesting a pan-adaptationist view of evolution, and dismisses Pinker and Bloom's question of whether "Language has evolved as an adaptation" as being misleading. He argues instead that from a biological viewpoint the evolutionary origins of language is best conceptualized as being the probable result of a convergence of many separate adaptations into a complex system.

A similar argument is made by Terrence Deacon who in The Symbolic Species argues that the different features of language have co-evolved with the evolution of the mind and that the ability to use symbolic communication is integrated in all other cognitive processes.

=== Exaptation ===
Exaptations, like adaptations, are fitness-enhancing characteristics, but according to Gould, their purposes were appropriated as the species evolved. There are two possible reasons: the trait’s original function was no longer necessary and so the trait took on a new purpose, or the trait does not arise for a certain purpose but later becomes important. Typically exaptations have a specific shape and design which becomes the space for a new function. The foundation of the argument comes from the low-lying position of the larynx in humans. Other mammals have the same positioning of the larynx, but no other species has acquired language. That leads exaptationists to see an evolved modification away from its original purpose.

== Genes and language ==
Research has shown that “genetic constraints” on language evolution could have caused a “specialized” and “species-specific language module. It is through this module that there are many specified “domain-specific linguistic properties,” such as syntax and agreement. Adaptationists believe that language genes “coevolved with human language itself for the purpose of communication.” This view suggests that the genes that are involved with language would only have coevolved in a very stable linguistic environment. This shows that language could not have evolved in a rapidly changing environment because that type of environment would not have been stable enough for natural selection. Without natural selection, the genes would not have coevolved with the ability for language, and instead, would have come from “cultural conventions.” The adaptationist belief that genes coevolved with language also suggests that there are no “arbitrary properties of language.” This is because they would have coevolved with language through natural selection.

The Baldwin effect provides a possible explanation for how language characteristics that are learned over time could become encoded in genes. He suggested, like Darwin did, that organisms that can adapt a trait faster have a “selective advantage.” As generations pass, less environmental stimuli is needed for organisms of the species to develop that trait. Eventually no environmental stimuli are needed and it is at this point that the trait has become “genetically encoded.”

=== FOXP2 gene ===
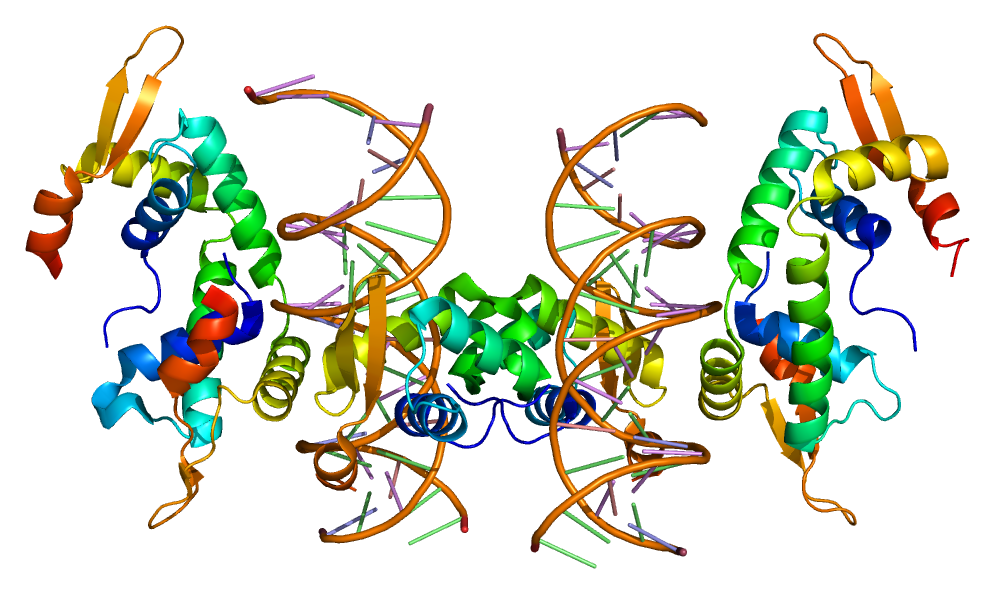
Structure of the FOXP2 protein. Based on PyMOL rendering of Protein Data Bank (PDB) 2ao9.

The genetic and cognitive components of language have long been under speculation, only recently have linguists pointed out a gene that may possibly explain how language works. Evolutionary psychologists hold that the FOXP2 gene may well be associated with the evolution of human language. In the 1980s, psycholinguist Myrna Gopnik identified a dominant gene that causes language impairment in the KE family of Britain. The KE family has a mutation in the FOXP2, that makes them suffer from a speech and language disorder. It has been argued that the FOXP2 gene is the grammar gene, which is what allows humans the ability to form proper syntax and make our communication of higher quality. Children that grow up in a stable environment develop highly proficient language without any instruction. Individuals with a mutation to their FOXP2 gene have trouble mastering complex sentences, and shows signs of developmental verbal dyspraxia.

This gene most likely evolved in the hominin line after the hominin and the chimpanzee lines split; this accounts for the fact that only humans can learn and understand grammar. Humans have a unique allele of this gene, which has otherwise been closely conserved through most of mammalian evolutionary history. This unique allele seems to have first appeared between 100 and 200 thousand years ago, and it is now all but universal in humans. This suggests that speech evolved late in the overall spectrum of human evolution.

== Variation in human language ==
By some classifications, nearly 7000 languages exist worldwide, with a great amount of variation thought to have evolved through cultural differentiation. There are four factors that are thought to be the reason as to why language variation exists between cultures: founder effects, drift, hybridization and adaptation. With the vast amounts of lands available, different tribes branched out to claim territory, which would require new place names, as well as names for new activities (such as terms for new fishing techniques required in streams by a people who had previously only fished from the ocean). Groups that lived far apart had little or no communication, even if they originally spoke the same language, which allowed their languages to drift apart.

Hybridization also played a significant role in the language evolution. One group would come in contact with another tribe. Thn, the two groups would pick up words and sounds from each other, which eventually leads to the formation of a new language.

Finally, adaptation would have an impact on language differentiation. Natural environments and cultural contexts would change over time and so the groups had to adapt to the environment, and their language had to adapt to it as well. For example, the introduction of bronze-making in an area would prompt the introduction or creation of terms related to bronze.

Atkinson theorized that language may have originated in Africa since African languages have a greater variation of speech sounds than languages elsewhere. Those sounds are seen as the root for the other languages that exist across the world.

== Communication in other animals ==
Research indicates that nonhuman animals such as apes, dolphins, and songbirds show evidence of language. Comparative studies of the sensory-motor system reveal that speech is not special to humans: nonhuman primates can discriminate between two different spoken languages. Anatomical aspects of humans, particularly the descended larynx, has been believed to be unique to humans' capacity to speak. However, further research revealed that several other mammals have a descended larynx besides humans, which indicates that a descended larynx must not be the only anatomical feature needed for speech production.

Vocal imitation is not uniquely human as well. Songbirds seem to acquire species-specific songs by imitating. Because nonhuman primates do not have a descended larynx, they lack vocal imitative capacity, which is why studies involving these primates have taught them nonverbal means of communication, e.g., sign language.

Koko and Nim Chimpsky are two apes that have successfully learned to use sign language but not to the extent of human beings. Nim is a chimpanzee that was taken in by a family in the 1970s and was raised as if he were a human child. He mastered 150 signs, which were limited but useful. Koko was a gorilla that was taken in by a Stanford student. She mastered 1,000 signs for generative communication.

== See also ==
- Essay on the Origin of Languages
- Evolutionary anthropology
- Evolutionary linguistics
- Human evolution
- Language acquisition
- Linguistic anthropology
- Linguistic universals
- Neurobiological origins of language
- Origin of language
- Origin of speech
- Origins of society
- Physical anthropology
- Proto-Human language
- Proto-language
- Recent African origin of modern humans
- Signalling theory
- Sociocultural evolution
- Symbolic culture
- Universal grammar
