= Payroll (disambiguation) =

Payroll is the record of money paid or due to employees.

It may also mean:

- Payroll, a 1959 novel
- Payroll, a 1961 film
