= Bow Wow =

Bow wow is onomatopoeia for a dog's bark.

Bow Wow may also refer to:

== Music ==
- Bow Wow (band) (also known as Vow Wow), a Japanese hard rock/heavy metal band
- Bow Wow (rapper), formerly Lil' Bow Wow, (born 1987), American rapper and actor

=== Songs ===
- "Bow Wow (That's My Name)", a 2000 song by Lil' Bow Wow
- "Bow Wow", a 2003 song by The Fiery Furnaces, appearing on Gallowsbird's Bark
- "Bow Wow Blues (My Mama Treat Me like a Dog)", a 1921 song by Cliff Friend & Nat Osborne

== Other uses ==
- Bow Wow (manga), Japanese manga
- Wow-Wow sauce, also a sauce developed in the Cotswolds region of England
- Bow-wow theory, theory regarding the origins of human sounds
- BowWow (The Legend of Zelda), a character that appears within The Legend of Zelda series
- Bow-wow Battle, upcoming Japanese video game

== See also ==
- Bow Wow Wow, a UK new wave band
- "Bow Wow Wow" (song), by Funkdoobiest, 1992
- "Atomic Dog", a George Clinton song with the words "Bow wow wow"
