= Derek Bickerton =

American linguist (1926–2018)

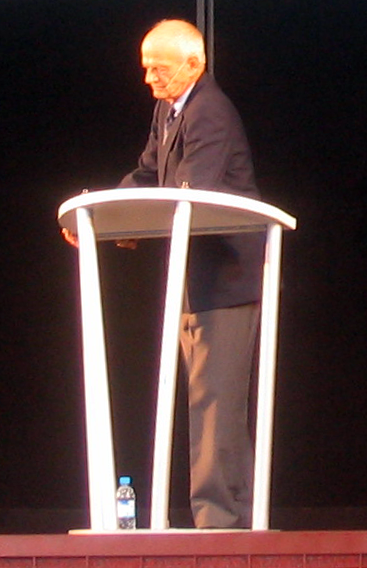
- Bickerton at the 2004 Universal Forum of Cultures in Barcelona
- Born: March 25, 1926; Cheshire, England
- Died: March 5, 2018 (aged 91)
- Known for: work on creole languages

Academic background
- Education: University of Cambridge (BA, PhD), University of Leeds

Academic work
- Institutions: University of Hawaiʻi at Mānoa; University of Guyana; University of Cape Coast, Ghana

Derek Bickerton (March 25, 1926 – March 5, 2018) was an English-born American linguist, novelist, and professor at the University of Hawaiʻi at Mānoa. Based on his work in creole languages in Guyana and Hawaii, he has proposed that the features of creole languages provide powerful insights into the development of language both by individuals and as a feature of the human species. He is the originator and main proponent of the language bioprogram hypothesis according to which the similarity of creoles is due to their being formed from a prior pidgin by children who all share a universal human innate grammar capacity.

Bickerton also wrote several novels. His novels have been featured in the works of the Sun Ra Revival Post Krautrock Archestra, through spoken word and musical themes.

== Background ==
Bickerton was born in Cheshire in 1926. A graduate of the University of Cambridge, England in 1949, Derek Bickerton entered academic life in the 1960s, first as a lecturer in English Literature at the University of Cape Coast, Ghana, and then, after a year's postgraduate work in linguistics at the University of Leeds, as senior lecturer in linguistics at the University of Guyana (1967–71). For twenty-four years he was Associate Professor and Professor of Linguistics at the University of Hawaiʻi at Mānoa (1972–96), having meanwhile received a PhD in linguistics in 1976 from the University of Cambridge. He was the father of contemporary artist Ashley Bickerton. His other children are Julie Bickerton Bravata and Jim Bickerton.

== Research ==
To answer questions about creole formation, in the late 1970s Bickerton proposed an experiment that involves marooning on an island six couples speaking six different languages, along with children too young to have acquired their parents’ languages. The National Science Foundation deemed the proposed experiment unethical and refused to fund it.

In his book Roots of Language (1981), Bickerton poses three questions: 1) How did creole languages originate? 2) How do children acquire language? 3) How did the language faculty originate as a feature of the human species?

In Language and Species (1990), he suggests that all three questions might be answered by postulating that the origin of language can be traced to the evolution of representation systems and symbolic thinking, together with a later development of formal syntax. Using primitive communication faculties, which then evolved in parallel, mental models became shared representations subject to cultural evolution. In Lingua ex Machina (2000), he and William Calvin revise this speculative theory by considering the biological foundations of symbolic representation and their influence on the evolution of the brain.

In his memoir Bastard Tongues (2008), he describes himself as a "street linguist" who emphasizes field work, with a "total lack of respect for the respectable", and he outlines his theories for a general audience.

In Adam’s Tongue (2009), he makes an argument about the origin of language which relies on niche construction to supply the required evolutionary catalyst. He claims that human language is not on a continuum with animal communication systems (ACSs) but is a qualitatively different communicative system. Animal communication systems are only indexical, restricted to conveying information about immediate circumstances insofar as these impinge upon individual survival, reproduction, and social relations. Human language, on the other hand, is capable of spatial and temporal displacement.

Bickerton argues that peculiar features characterizing the ecological niche of early man allowed for this breakthrough from an ACS into language. He cites the fact that around two million years ago our ancestors were finding their way to the top of a scavenging pyramid, accessing the carcasses of megafauna before other predators and holding them off by working in coordinated groups. By imitating an animal, like a mammoth, one member could attempt to communicate information about such food sources. Although such imitative signaling retained an iconic character rather than fully symbolic, they involved an act of displacement in communication since the body could be miles away and discovered hours earlier. Over time, the sounds signifying something like a mammoth would be decontextualized and come to resemble something much more closely resembling a word. Displacement, Bickerton claims, is the hallmark feature of language.

In Bickerton's view, these words allowed the formation of concepts rather than mere categories that animals are also capable of. Words began as the anchors for sensory information and memories about a specific animal or object. Once the brain had words it could create concepts which came together as a 'protolanguage'. The protolanguage remained much like a pidgin for a million years or more, eventually it went from the "beads-on-a-string" model of speech to a hierarchical structure through Merge. Bickerton died in March 2018 at the age of 91.

== Bibliography ==
- Payroll, 1959. Adapted into 1961 film of the same title
- Bickerton, Derek (1962). The Murders of Boysie Singh: Robber, Arsonist, Pirate, Mass-Murderer, Vice and Gambling King of Trinidad. Arthur Barker Limited, London.
- Tropicana, A Novel., 1963
- Dynamics Of A Creole System, 1975
- Bickerton, Derek (1981). Roots of Language. Karoma Publishers. ISBN 978-0-89720-044-8.
  - Bickerton, Derek (2016). Roots of Language. Language Science Press. ISBN 978-3-946234-08-1.
- Bickerton, Derek, (1984). The language bioprogram hypothesis, in: Behavioral and Brain Sciences, 7, pages 173–221.
- Bickerton, Derek (1990). Language and Species. University of Chicago Press. ISBN 978-0-226-04610-5.
- Language and Human Behavior, 1995
- Lingua ex Machina: Reconciling Darwin and Chomsky with the Human Brain, 2000 (co-author with William H. Calvin)
- Bickerton, Derek (2008). Bastard Tongues. Hill and Wang. ISBN 978-0-8090-2817-7.
- Bickerton, Derek (2009). Adam's Tongue. Hill and Wang. ISBN 978-0-8090-2281-6.
- Bickerton, Derek (2014). More than Nature Needs: Language, Mind, and Evolution. Harvard University Press. ISBN 978-0-674-72490-7.
