= Monogenetic theory of pidgins =

Linguistic hypothesis on the origin of pidgins and creoles

According to the theory of monogenesis in its most radical form, all pidgins and creole languages of the world can be ultimately traced back to one linguistic variety. This idea was first formulated by Hugo Schuchardt in the late 19th century and popularized in the late 1950s and early 1960s by Taylor (1961) and Thompson (1961). It assumes that some type of pidgin language, dubbed West African Pidgin Portuguese, based on Portuguese was spoken from the 15th to 18th centuries in the forts established by the Portuguese on the West African coast. This variety was the starting point of all the pidgin and creole languages. This would explain to some extent why Portuguese lexical items can be found in many creoles, but more importantly, it would account for the numerous grammatical similarities shared by such languages.

== Evidence ==
Keith Whinnom pinpointed the idea that a proto-pidgin "spread via normal linguistic diffusion" and claimed that there are many similarities between Spanish contact vernaculars and languages of this type used in the Philippines and a Portuguese Creole in India. These similarities are to be found in the fields of syntax and certain parts of vocabulary.

While many creoles around the world have lexicons based on languages other than Portuguese (e.g. English, French, Spanish, Dutch), it was hypothesized that such creoles were derived from this lingua franca by means of relexification, i.e. the process in which a pidgin or creole incorporates a significant amount of its lexicon from another language while keeping the grammar intact. There is some evidence that relexification is a real process. Pieter Muysken and Bakker & Mous (1994) show that there are languages which derive their grammar and lexicon from two different languages respectively, which could be easily explained with the relexification hypothesis. Also, Saramaccan seems to be a pidgin frozen in the middle of relexification from Portuguese to English. However, in cases of such mixed languages, as Bakker & Mous (1994) call them, there is never a one-to-one relationship between the grammar or lexicon of the mixed language and the grammar or lexicon of the language they attribute it to.

Todd (1990) attempted to postulate the relatedness of pidgins and creoles, with a lingua franca known as Sabir or Mediterranean Lingua Franca as the starting point, which was then relexified by the Portuguese and then subsequently by various other European powers.

== Problems ==
However, monogenesis and relexification have a number of problems. First, as Todd admits, pidgins, by "shedding linguistic redundancies" such as syntactic complexity, have removed the features that allow linguists to identify relatedness. Relexification assumes that, in learning a second language, people can learn vocabulary and grammar separately and will learn the latter but replace the former. In addition, pidgin languages are inherently unstructured, so relexification does not account for how the syntactic structure of a creole could emerge from the languages that lack such structure; in other words, relexification alone cannot explain why creole languages gain complex grammar.

Bickerton (1977) also points out that relexification postulates too many improbabilities and that it is unlikely that a language "could be disseminated round the entire tropical zone, to peoples of widely differing language background, and still preserve a virtually complete identity in its grammatical structure wherever it took root, despite considerable changes in its phonology and virtually complete changes in its lexicon."

== See also ==
- Language bioprogram theory
- Linguistic monogenesis and polygenesis
- Mediterranean Lingua Franca, aka the "Sabir language"

== Bibliography ==
- Arends, Jacques; Muysken, Pieter; Smith, Norval, eds. (1995), Pidgins and creoles: An introduction, Amsterdam: John Benjamins, ISBN 90-272-5236-X
- Bakker, P; Mous, M, eds. (1994), Mixed Languages, Amsterdam: IFOTT
- Bakker, Peter; Muysken, Pieter (1994), "Mixed languages and language intertwining", in Jacques Arends; Pieter Muysken; Norval Smith (eds.), Pidgins and Creoles: An introduction, Amsterdam: John Benjamins, pp. 41–52
- Bickerton, Derek (1977). "Pidginization and creolization: Language acquisition and language universals". In A. Valdman (ed.). Pidgin and creole languages. Bloomington: Indiana University Press. pp. 49–69.
- Holm, John A. (1989), Pidgins and Creoles volume I: Theory and Structure, Melbourne: Cambridge University Press
- Holm, John A. (2000), An Introduction to Pidgins and Creoles, Melbourne: Cambridge University Press, ISBN 0-521-58581-3
- Muysken, Pieter (1981), "Halfway between Spanish and Quechua: The Case for Relexification", in Highfield, A; A. Walden (eds.), Historicity and Variation in Creole Studies, Ann Arbor: Karoma Press
- Muysken, Pieter; Veenstra, T (1995), "Universalist Approaches", in Arends, Jacques; Muysken, Pieter; Smith, Norval (eds.), Pidgins and creoles: An introduction, Amsterdam: Benjamins, ISBN 90-272-5236-X
- Taylor, Douglas (1961), "New languages for old in the West Indies", Comparative Studies in Society and History, 3 (3): 277–288, doi:10.1017/S0010417500012238, S2CID 143127340
- Wardhaugh, Ronald (2002), "Pidgins and Creoles", An Introduction to Sociolinguistics (fourth ed.), Blackwell Publishing, pp. 57–86
- Thompson, R.W. (1961), "A note on some possible affinities between the creole dialects of the Old World and those of the New.", in Le Page, R.B (ed.), Creole Language Studies, vol. 2
- Todd, Loreto (1990), Pidgins and Creoles, New York: Routledge
