= W. Tecumseh Fitch =

American biologist (born 1963)

W Tecumseh Fitch
- Born: William Tecumseh Sherman Fitch III; 1963 (age 62–63); Boston, Massachusetts, U.S.
- Education: Brown University (B.A., Ph.D.)
- Scientific career
- Workplaces: University of Vienna; Harvard University; University of St. Andrews
- Doctoral advisor: Philip Lieberman

William Tecumseh Sherman Fitch III (born 1963) is an American evolutionary biologist and cognitive scientist at the University of Vienna (Vienna, Austria) where he is co-founder of the Department of Cognitive Biology. He was elected a Member of the National Academy of Sciences in 2025.

Fitch studies the biology and evolution of cognition and communication in humans and other animals, and in particular the evolution of speech, language and music. His work concentrates on comparative approaches as advocated by Charles Darwin (i.e., the study of homologous and analogous structures and processes in a wide range of species).

== Early life and education ==
Fitch was born in Boston and received his B.A. (1986) in biology and his Ph.D. (1994) in Cognitive and Linguistic Sciences from Brown University. From 1996 to 2000, he worked as a postdoctoral fellow at MIT and Harvard University. He was a lecturer at Harvard University and a reader at the University of St Andrews, before moving to a professorship at the University of Vienna in 2009.

He bears the name of his third-generation great-grandfather, Civil War General William Tecumseh Sherman, as did his father, and grandfather (Tecumseh Sherman Fitch), before him.

== Evolution of Speech ==
Fitch and colleagues used x-ray recordings of macaque monkeys producing various sounds to make a model of the monkey vocal tract. The model showed that a macaque could produce a range of vowels and non-vowel phonemes adequate for intelligible speech. The simulations were used to model a monkey uttering the phrase "Will you marry me?" in a recognizable manner, demonstrating that the anatomy of monkeys does not limit them from producing complex speech. In conclusion, Fitch stated that "If a human brain were in control, they could talk".

== Bibliography ==
- Fitch, W. T. (2010). The Evolution of Language. Cambridge: Cambridge University Press.
- Fitch, W. T. (1997). "Vocal tract length and formant frequency dispersion correlate with body size in rhesus macaques", Journal of the Acoustical Society of America 102: 1213–1222.
- Fitch, W. T. (2000). "The evolution of speech: a comparative review", Trends Cog. Sci. 4, 258–267.
- Fitch, W.T. and D. Reby (2001), "The descended larynx is not uniquely human". Proceedings of the Royal Society, B, 268(1477): 1669–1675.
- Hauser, M. D., Chomsky, N. & Fitch, W. T. (2002). "The Language Faculty: What is it, who has it, and how did it evolve?" Science 298: 1569–1579.
- Fitch, W. T., & Hauser, M. D. (2004). "Computational constraints on syntactic processing in a nonhuman primate". Science 303: 377–380.
- Fitch, W. T. (2005). "The evolution of language: A comparative review ", Biology and Philosophy 20: 193–230.
- Fitch, W. T. (2006). "The biology and evolution of music: A comparative perspective ", Cognition 100: 173–215.

== See also ==
- Biolinguistics
- Biomusicology
- Cognitive biology
- Comparative psychology
- Digital infinity
- Descended larynx
- Evolutionary psychology
- Hoover (seal)
- Origin of language
- Origin of speech
- Origin of music
- Vocal learning
