= Origin of language =

Relationship between language and human evolution

The origin of language, its relationship with human evolution, and its consequences have been subjects of study for centuries. Scholars wishing to study the origins of language draw inferences from evidence such as the fossil record, archaeological evidence, and contemporary language diversity. They may also study language acquisition as well as comparisons between human language and systems of animal communication (particularly those of other primates). Many argue for the close relation between the origins of language and the origins of modern human behavior, but there is little agreement about the facts and implications of this connection.

The shortage of direct, empirical evidence has caused many scholars to regard the entire topic as unsuitable for serious study; in 1866, the Linguistic Society of Paris banned any existing or future debates on the subject, a prohibition which remained influential across much of the Western world until the late twentieth century. Various hypotheses have been developed on the emergence of language.

While Charles Darwin's theory of evolution by natural selection had provoked a surge of speculation on the origin of language over a century and a half ago, the speculations had not resulted in a scientific consensus by 1996. Despite this, academic interest had returned to the topic by the early 1990s. Linguists, archaeologists, psychologists, and anthropologists have renewed the investigation into the origin of language with modern methods.

== Approaches ==
Attempts to explain the origin of language take a variety of forms:

- "Continuity theories" build on the idea that language exhibits so much complexity that one cannot imagine it simply appearing from nothing in its final form; therefore it must have evolved from earlier pre-linguistic systems among humans' primate ancestors.
- "Discontinuity theories" take the opposite approach, stating that language, as a unique trait that cannot be compared to anything found among non-humans, must have appeared fairly suddenly during the course of human evolution.
- Some theories consider language mostly as an innate faculty—largely genetically encoded.
- Other theories regard language as a mainly cultural system that is learned through social interaction.

Some researchers have proposed continuity-based theories between human language and non-human communication systems, but they differ in how they hypothesize the emergence and development of language. Some among those who consider language mostly innate avoid speculating about specific precursors in non-human primates, stressing simply that the language faculty must have evolved gradually.

Those who consider language to be learned socially, such as Michael Tomasello, consider it developing from the cognitively controlled aspects of primate communication, mostly gestural rather than vocal. Where vocal precursors are concerned, many continuity theorists envisage language as evolving from early human capacities for song.

Noam Chomsky, a proponent of discontinuity theory, argues that a single change occurred in humans before leaving Africa, coincident with the Great Leap approximately 100,000 years ago, in which a common language faculty developed in a group of humans and their descendants. Chomsky bases his argument on the observation that any human baby of any culture can be raised in a different culture and will completely assimilate the language and behaviour of the new culture in which they were raised. This implies that no major change to the human language faculty has occurred since they left Africa.

Transcending the continuity-versus-discontinuity divide, some scholars view the emergence of language as the consequence of some kind of social transformation. This social transformation involved generating unprecedented levels of public trust which liberated a genetic potential for linguistic creativity that had previously lain dormant. "Ritual/speech coevolution theory" exemplifies this approach. Scholars in this intellectual camp point to the fact that even chimpanzees and bonobos have latent symbolic capacities that they rarely—if ever—use in the wild. Objecting to the sudden mutation idea, these authors argue that even if a chance mutation were to install a language organ in an evolving bipedal primate, it would be adaptively useless under all known primate social conditions. A very specific social structure—one capable of upholding unusually high levels of public accountability and trust—must have evolved before or concurrently with language to make reliance on "cheap signals" (e.g., words, where no actual resources are exchanged) an evolutionarily stable strategy.

For those who favor more ancient origins for the emergence of language as laying so far back in human prehistory, the relevant developments have left no direct historical traces, and comparable processes cannot be observed today. Despite this, the emergence of new sign languages in modern times—Nicaraguan Sign Language, for example—may offer insights into the developmental stages and creative processes necessarily involved. Another approach inspects early human fossils, looking for traces of physical adaptation to language use. In some cases, when the DNA of extinct humans can be recovered, the presence or absence of genes considered to be language-relevant—FOXP2, for example—may prove informative. Another approach, this time archaeological, involves invoking symbolic behavior (such as repeated ritual activity) that may leave an archaeological trace—such as mining and modifying ochre pigments for body-painting—while developing theoretical arguments to justify inferences from symbolism in general to language in particular.

The time range for the evolution of language or its anatomical prerequisites extends, at least in principle, from the phylogenetic divergence of Homo from Pan to the emergence of full behavioral modernity some 50,000–150,000 years ago. Few dispute that Australopithecus probably lacked vocal communication significantly more sophisticated than that of great apes in general, but scholarly opinions vary as to the developments since the appearance of Homo some 2.5 million years ago. Some scholars assume the development of primitive language-like systems (proto-language) as early as Homo habilis, while others place the development of symbolic communication only with Homo erectus (1.8 million years ago) or with Homo heidelbergensis (0.6 million years ago) and the development of language proper with Homo sapiens, currently estimated at less than 200,000 years ago.

Using statistical methods to estimate the time required to achieve the current spread and diversity in modern languages, Johanna Nichols, a linguist at the University of California, Berkeley, argued in 1998 that vocal languages must have begun diversifying in the human species at least 100,000 years ago. Estimates of this kind are not universally accepted, but jointly considering genetic, archaeological, palaeontological, and much other evidence indicates that language likely emerged somewhere in sub-Saharan Africa during the Middle Stone Age, roughly contemporaneous with the speciation of Homo sapiens.

== Language origin hypotheses ==
=== Early speculations ===
I cannot doubt that language owes its origin to the imitation and modification, aided by signs and gestures, of various natural sounds, the voices of other animals, and man's own instinctive cries.

— Charles Darwin, 1871. The Descent of Man, and Selection in Relation to Sex

In 1861, historical linguist Max Müller published a list of speculative theories concerning the origins of spoken language:

- Bow-wow. The bow-wow, or cuckoo, theory, which Müller attributed to the German philosopher Johann Gottfried Herder, saw early words as imitations of the cries of beasts and birds.
- Pooh-pooh. The pooh-pooh theory saw the first words as emotional interjections and exclamations triggered by pain, pleasure, surprise, etc.
- Ding-dong. Müller suggested what he called the ding-dong theory, which states that all things have a vibrating natural resonance, echoed somehow by humans in their earliest words.
- Yo-he-ho. The yo-he-ho theory claims that language emerged from collective rhythmic labor; that is, the attempt to synchronize muscular efforts resulting in sounds such as heave alternating with sounds such as ho.
- Ta-ta. The ta-ta theory did not feature in Max Müller's list, having been proposed in 1930 by Sir Richard Paget. According to the ta-ta theory, humans made the earliest words by tongue movements that mimicked manual gestures, rendering them audible.

Contemporary scholars considered such theories as offering peripheral insights, but naïve and irrelevant with respect to the origin of speech altogether. One critique of these theories is that they rest on the assumption that once early humans had discovered a workable mechanism for linking sounds with meanings, language would automatically have evolved.

Medieval Muslim scholars developed theories on the origin of language. Their theories were of five general types:

1. Naturalist: There is a natural relationship between expressions and the things they signify. Language thus emerged from a natural human inclination to imitate the sounds of nature.
2. Conventionalist: Language is a social convention. The names of things are arbitrary inventions of humans.
3. Revelationist: Language was gifted to humans by God, and it was thus God—and not humans—who named everything.
4. Revelationist-Conventionalist: God revealed to humans a core base of language, enabling humans to communicate with each other, and then humans invented the rest of language.
5. Non-Committal: The view that conventionalist and revelationist theories are equally plausible.

=== Problems of reliability and deception ===
From the perspective of signalling theory, the main obstacle to the evolution of language-like communication in nature is not a mechanistic one. Rather, it is the fact that symbols—arbitrary associations of sounds or other perceptible forms with corresponding meanings—are unreliable and may as well be false. The problem of reliability was not recognized at all by Darwin, Müller, or the other early evolutionary theorists.

Animal vocal signals are, for the most part, intrinsically reliable. When a cat purrs, the signal constitutes direct evidence of the animal's contented state. The signal is trusted, not because the cat is inclined to be honest, but because it just cannot fake that sound. Primate vocal calls may be slightly more manipulable, but they remain reliable for the same reason: they are hard to fake. Primate social intelligence is "Machiavellian"; that is, self-serving and unconstrained by moral scruples. Monkeys, apes, and particularly humans often attempt to deceive each other, while at the same time remaining constantly on guard against falling victim to deception themselves. Paradoxically, it is theorized that primates' resistance to deception is what blocks the evolution of their signalling systems along language-like lines. Language is ruled out because the best way to guard against being deceived is to ignore all signals except those that are instantly verifiable. Words automatically fail this test.

Words are easy to fake. Should they turn out to be lies, listeners will adapt by ignoring them in favor of hard-to-fake indices or cues. For language to work, listeners must be confident that those with whom they are on speaking terms are generally likely to be honest. A peculiar feature of language is displaced reference, which means reference to topics outside the currently perceptible situation. This property prevents utterances from being corroborated in the immediate "here" and "now." For this reason, language presupposes relatively high levels of mutual trust in order to become established over time as an evolutionarily stable strategy. This stability is born of a longstanding mutual trust and is what grants language its authority. A theory of the origins of language must therefore explain why humans could begin trusting cheap signals in ways that other animals apparently cannot.

==== The "mother tongues" hypothesis ====
The "mother tongues" hypothesis was proposed in 2004 as a possible solution to this problem. W. Tecumseh Fitch suggested that the Darwinian principle of "kin selection," the convergence of genetic interests between relatives, might be part of the answer. Fitch suggests that languages were originally "mother tongues." If language evolved initially for communication between mothers and their own biological offspring, extending later to include adult relatives as well, the interests of speakers and listeners would have tended to coincide. Fitch argues that shared genetic interests would have led to sufficient trust and cooperation for intrinsically unreliable signals—words—to become accepted as trustworthy and so begin evolving for the first time.

Critics of this theory point out that kin selection is not unique to humans. So even if one accepts Fitch's initial premises, the extension of the posited "mother tongue" networks from close relatives to more distant relatives remains unexplained. Fitch argues, however, that the extended period of physical immaturity of human infants and the postnatal growth of the human brain give the human-infant relationship a different and more extended period of intergenerational dependency than that found in any other species.

==== The "obligatory reciprocal altruism" hypothesis ====
Ib Ulbæk invokes another standard Darwinian principle—"reciprocal altruism"—to explain the unusually high levels of intentional honesty necessary for language to evolve. "Reciprocal altruism" can be expressed as the principle that if you scratch my back, I'll scratch yours. In linguistic terms, this would mean that if you speak truthfully to me, I'll speak truthfully to you. Ordinary Darwinian reciprocal altruism, Ulbæk points out, is a relationship established between frequently interacting individuals. For language to prevail across an entire community, however, the necessary reciprocity would have needed to be enforced universally instead of being left to individual choice. Ulbæk concludes that for language to evolve, society as a whole must have been subject to moral regulation.

Critics point out that this theory fails to explain when, how, why, or by whom "obligatory reciprocal altruism" could possibly have been enforced. Various proposals have been offered to remedy this defect. Humans in conversational groups seem to want to advertise to the world their access to socially relevant information, lending to the theory that linguistic behavior is not at all altruistic, but acts as a form of trade where status is earned through the provision of relevant information.

==== The gossip and grooming hypothesis ====
In gossip, according to Robin Dunbar in his book Grooming, Gossip and the Evolution of Language, language does for group-living humans what manual grooming does for other primates—it allows individuals to service their relationships and so maintain their alliances on the basis of the principle of reciprocal altruism. Dunbar argues that as humans began living in increasingly larger social groups, the task of manually grooming all one's friends and acquaintances became so time-consuming as to be unaffordable. In response to this problem, humans developed "a cheap and ultra-efficient form of grooming"—vocal grooming. To keep allies happy, one now needs only to "groom" them with low-cost vocal sounds, servicing multiple allies simultaneously while keeping both hands free for other tasks. Vocal grooming then evolved gradually into vocal language, initially in the form of "gossip." Dunbar's hypothesis seems to be supported by adaptations, in the structure of language, to the function of narration in general.

Critics of this theory point out that the efficiency of "vocal grooming"—the fact that words are so cheap—would have undermined its capacity to signal commitment of the kind conveyed by time-consuming and costly manual grooming. Further, the theory does nothing to explain the crucial transition from vocal grooming—the production of pleasing but meaningless sounds—to the cognitive complexities of syntactical speech.

==== Ritual/speech coevolution ====
The ritual/speech coevolution theory was originally proposed by social anthropologist Roy Rappaport before being elaborated by anthropologists such as Chris Knight, Jerome Lewis, Nick Enfield, Camilla Power, and Ian Watts. Cognitive scientist and robotics engineer Luc Steels is another prominent supporter of this general approach, as is biological anthropologist and neuroscientist Terrence Deacon. A more recent champion of the approach is the Chomskyan specialist in linguistic syntax, Cedric Boeckx.

These scholars argue that there can be no such thing as a "theory of the origins of language." This is because language is not a separate adaptation, but an internal aspect of something much wider, namely, the entire domain known to anthropologists as human symbolic culture. Attempts to explain language independently of this wider context have failed, say these scientists, because they are addressing a problem with no solution. Language would not work outside its necessary environment of confidence-building social mechanisms and institutions. For example, it would not work for a nonhuman ape communicating with others of its kind in the wild. Not even the cleverest nonhuman ape could make language work under such conditions.

Lie and alternative, inherent in language... pose problems to any society whose structure is founded on language, which is to say all human societies. I have therefore argued that if there are to be words at all it is necessary to establish The Word, and that The Word is established by the invariance of liturgy.

— Roy Rappaport

Advocates of this school of thought point out that words are cheap. Should an especially clever nonhuman ape, or even a group of articulate nonhuman apes, try to use words in the wild, they would carry no conviction. The primate vocalizations that do carry conviction—those they actually use—are unlike words, in that they are emotionally expressive, intrinsically meaningful, and reliable because they are relatively costly and hard to fake.

Oral and gestural languages consist of pattern-making whose cost is essentially zero. As pure social conventions, signals of this kind cannot evolve in a Darwinian social world—they are a theoretical impossibility. Being intrinsically unreliable, language works only if one can build up a reputation for trustworthiness within a certain kind of society, namely, one where symbolic cultural facts (sometimes called "institutional facts") can be established and maintained through collective social endorsement. In any hunter-gatherer society, the basic mechanism for establishing trust in symbolic cultural facts is collective ritual. Therefore, the task facing researchers into the origins of language is more multidisciplinary than is usually supposed. It involves addressing the evolutionary emergence of human ritual, kinship, religion, and symbolic culture taken as a whole, with language an important but subsidiary component.

In a 2023 article, Cedric Boeckx endorses the Rappaport/Searle/Knight way of capturing the "special" nature of human words. Words are symbols. This means that, from the standpoint of Darwinian signal evolution theory, they are "patently false signals." Words are facts, but "facts whose existence depends entirely on subjective belief." In philosophical terms, they are "institutional facts": fictions that are granted factual status within human social institutions. From this standpoint, according to Boeckx, linguistic utterances are symbolic to the extent that they are patent falsehoods serving as guides to communicative intentions. "They are communicatively useful untruths, as it were." The reason why words can survive among humans despite being false is due largely to a matter of trust. The corresponding origins theory is that language can only have begun to evolve from the moment humans started reciprocally faking in communicatively helpful ways, i.e., when they became capable of upholding the levels of trust necessary for linguistic communication to work.

An ape or other nonhuman must always generate the trust necessary for communication to work. Each signal it emits must be useful for communication. If the signal fails, the basic communication can cause confusion. Carried to its conclusion, this should permit digital signaling—the cheapest and most efficient kind of communication.

From this philosophical standpoint, animal communication cannot be digital because it does not have the luxury of being patently false. Costly signals of any kind can only be evaluated on an analog scale. Put differently, truly symbolic, digital signals become socially acceptable only under highly unusual conditions, such as those internal to a ritually bonded community whose members are not tempted to lie.

Critics of the speech/ritual co-evolution theory include Noam Chomsky, who terms it the "non-existence" hypothesis—a denial of the very existence of language as an object of study for natural science. Chomsky's own theory is that language emerged in an instant and in perfect form, prompting his critics, in turn, to retort that only something that does not exist—a theoretical construct or convenient scientific fiction—could possibly emerge in such a miraculous way. The controversy remains unresolved.

=== Tool resiliency, grammar, and language production ===
Acheulean tool use began during the Lower Paleolithic approximately 1.75 million years ago. Studies focusing on the lateralization of Acheulean tool production and language production have noted similar areas of blood flow when a human being engages in these activities separately; this theory suggests that the brain functions needed for the production of tools across generations is consistent with the brain systems required for producing language. Researchers used functional transcranial Doppler ultrasonography (fTDC) and had participants perform activities related to the creation of tools using the same methods during the Lower Paleolithic as well as a task designed specifically for word generation. The purpose of this test was to focus on the planning aspect of Acheulean tool making and cued word generation in language (an example of cued word generation would be trying to list all words beginning with a given letter). Theories of language developing alongside tool use have been proposed by multiple scholars; however, until recently, there has been little empirical data to support these hypotheses. The study performed by Uomini et al. provides evidence for the usage of the same brain areas for cued word generation and Acheulean tool use. The relationship between tool use and language production is found in working and planning memory respectively and was found to be similar across a variety of participants, furthering evidence that these areas of the brain are shared. This evidence lends credibility to the theory that language developed alongside tool use in the Lower Paleolithic.

=== Humanistic theory ===
The humanistic tradition considers language as a human invention. Renaissance philosopher Antoine Arnauld gave a detailed description of his idea of the origin of language in Port-Royal Grammar. According to Arnauld, people are social and rational by nature, and this urged them to create language as a means to communicate their ideas to others. Language construction would have occurred through a slow and gradual process. In later theory, especially in functional linguistics, the primacy of communication is emphasised over psychological needs.

The exact way language evolved is however not considered as vital to the study of languages. Structural linguist Ferdinand de Saussure abandoned evolutionary linguistics after coming to the firm conclusion that it would not be able to provide any further revolutionary insight after the completion of the major works in historical linguistics by the end of the 19th century. Saussure was particularly sceptical of the attempts of August Schleicher and other Darwinian linguists to access prehistorical languages through series of reconstructions of proto-languages.

Saussure's solution to the problem of language evolution involves dividing theoretical linguistics in two. Evolutionary and historical linguistics are renamed as diachronic linguistics. It is the study of language change, but it has only limited explanatory power due to the inadequacy of all of the reliable research material that could ever be made available. Synchronic linguistics, in contrast, aims to widen scientists' understanding of language through a study of a given contemporary or historical language stage as a system in its own right.

Although Saussure put much focus on diachronic linguistics, later structuralists who equated structuralism with the synchronic analysis were sometimes criticised of ahistoricism. According to structural anthropologist Claude Lévi-Strauss, language and meaning—in opposition to "knowledge, which develops slowly and progressively"—must have appeared in an instant.

Structuralism, as first introduced to sociology by Émile Durkheim, is nonetheless a type of humanistic evolutionary theory which explains diversification as necessitated by growing complexity. There was a shift of focus to functional explanation after Saussure's death. Functional structuralists including the Prague Circle linguists and André Martinet explained the growth and maintenance of structures as being necessitated by their functions. For example, novel technologies make it necessary for people to invent new words, but these may lose their function and be forgotten as the technologies are eventually replaced by more modern ones.

=== Chomsky's single-step theory ===
According to Chomsky's single-mutation theory, the emergence of language resembled the formation of a crystal; with digital infinity as the seed crystal in a super-saturated primate brain, on the verge of blossoming into the human mind by physical law, evolution added a single small but crucial keystone. Thus, in this theory, language appeared rather suddenly within the history of human evolution. Chomsky, writing with computational linguist and computer scientist Robert C. Berwick, suggests that this scenario is completely compatible with modern biology. They note that "none of the recent accounts of human language evolution seem to have completely grasped the shift from conventional Darwinism to its fully stochastic modern version—specifically, that there are stochastic effects not only due to sampling like directionless drift, but also due to directed stochastic variation in fitness, migration, and heritability—indeed, all the "forces" that affect individual or gene frequencies.... All this can affect evolutionary outcomes—outcomes that as far as we can make out are not brought out in recent books on the evolution of language, yet would arise immediately in the case of any new genetic or individual innovation, precisely the kind of scenario likely to be in play when talking about language's emergence."

Citing evolutionary geneticist Svante Pääbo, they concur that a substantial difference must have differentiated Homo sapiens from Neanderthals to "prompt the relentless spread of our species, who had never crossed open water, up and out of Africa and then on across the entire planet in just a few tens of thousands of years.... What we do not see is any kind of 'gradualism' in new tool technologies or innovations like fire, shelters, or figurative art." Berwick and Chomsky therefore suggest language emerged approximately between 200,000 years ago and 60,000 years ago (between the appearance of the first anatomically modern humans in southern Africa and the last exodus from Africa). "That leaves us with about 130,000 years, or approximately 5,000–6,000 generations of time for evolutionary change. This is not 'overnight in one generation' as some have (incorrectly) inferred—but neither is it on the scale of geological eons. It's time enough—within the ballpark for what Nilsson and Pelger (1994) estimated as the time required for the full evolution of a vertebrate eye from a single cell, even without the invocation of any 'evo-devo' effects."

The single-mutation theory of language evolution has been directly questioned on different grounds. A formal analysis of the probability of such a mutation taking place and going to fixation in the species has concluded that such a scenario is unlikely, with multiple mutations with more moderate fitness effects being more probable. Another criticism has questioned the logic of the argument for single mutation and puts forward that from the formal simplicity of Merge, the capacity Berwick and Chomsky deem the core property of human language that emerged suddenly, one cannot derive the (number of) evolutionary steps that led to it.

=== The Romulus and Remus hypothesis ===
The Romulus and Remus hypothesis, proposed by neuroscientist Andrey Vyshedskiy, seeks to address the question why the modern speech apparatus originated over 500,000 years before the earliest signs of modern human imagination. This hypothesis proposes that there were two phases that led to modern recursive language. The phenomenon of recursion occurs across multiple linguistic domains, perhaps most prominently in syntax and morphology. Thus, by nesting a structure such as a sentence or a word within themselves, it enables the generation of potentially (countably) infinite new variations of that structure. For example, the base sentence [Peter likes apples.] can be nested in irrealis clauses to produce [Mary said [Peter likes apples.]], [Paul believed [Mary said [Peter likes apples.]]] and so forth.

The first phase includes the slow development of non-recursive language with a large vocabulary along with the modern speech apparatus, which includes changes to the hyoid bone, increased voluntary control of the muscles of the diaphragm, and the evolution of the FOXP2 gene, as well as other changes by 600,000 years ago. Then, the second phase was a rapid Chomskian single step, consisting of three distinct events that happened in quick succession around 70,000 years ago and allowed the shift from non-recursive to recursive language in early hominins:

1. A genetic mutation that significantly lengthened the critical period of prefrontal synthesis (PFS) of at least two children that lived together
2. The resulting ability of these children to create recursive elements of language such as spatial prepositions
3. The merger of this ability with their parents' non-recursive language to create recursive language.

That children should have a modern prefrontal cortex (PFC) is not sufficient to allow the development of PFS; the children must also be mentally stimulated and have recursive elements already in their language to acquire PFS. Since their parents would not have invented these elements yet, the children would have had to do it themselves, which is a common occurrence among young children that live together, in a process called cryptophasia. This means that delayed PFC development would have allowed more time to acquire PFS and develop recursive elements.

Delayed PFC development also brings negative consequences, such as a longer period of reliance on one's parents to survive and lower survival rates. For modern language to have occurred, PFC delay had to have an immense survival benefit in later life, such as PFS ability. This suggests that the mutation that caused PFC delay and the development of recursive language and PFS occurred simultaneously, which lines up with evidence of a genetic bottleneck around 70,000 years ago. This could have been the result of a few individuals who developed PFS and recursive language, which granted them significant competitive advantage over all other humans at the time.

=== Gestural theory ===
The gestural theory states that human language developed from gestures that were used for simple communication.

Two types of evidence support this theory:

1. Gestural language and vocal language depend on similar neural systems. The regions on the cortex that are responsible for mouth and hand movements border each other.
2. Nonhuman primates can use gestures or symbols for at least primitive communication, and some of their gestures resemble those of humans, such as the "begging posture," with the hands stretched out, which humans share with chimpanzees.

Research has found strong support for the idea that oral communication and sign language depend on similar neural structures. Patients who used sign language, and who suffered from a left-hemisphere lesion, showed the same disorders with their sign language as vocal patients did with their oral language. Other researchers found that the same left-hemisphere brain regions were active during the use of sign language as during the use of vocal or written language.

Primate gesture is at least partially genetic: different nonhuman apes will perform gestures characteristic of their species, even if they have never seen another ape perform that gesture. For example, gorillas beat their breasts. This shows that gestures are an intrinsic and important part of primate communication, which supports the idea that language evolved from gesture.

Further evidence suggests that gesture and language are linked. In humans, manual gesturing has an effect on concurrent vocalizations, thus creating certain natural vocal associations of manual efforts. Chimpanzees move their mouths when performing fine motor tasks. These mechanisms may have played an evolutionary role in enabling the development of intentional vocal communication as a supplement to gestural communication. Voice modulation could have been prompted by preexisting manual actions.

From infancy, gestures both supplement and predict speech. This addresses the idea that gestures quickly change in humans from a sole means of communication (from a very young age) to a supplemental and predictive behavior that is used despite the ability to communicate verbally. This too serves as a parallel to the idea that gestures developed first and language subsequently built upon it.

Two possible scenarios have been proposed for the development of language, one of which supports the gestural theory:

1. Language developed from the calls of human ancestors.
2. Language was derived from gesture.

The first perspective that language evolved from the calls of human ancestors seems logical because both humans and animals make sounds or cries. One evolutionary reason to refute this is that, anatomically, the center that controls calls in monkeys and other animals is located in a completely different part of the brain than in humans. In monkeys, this is located in the depths of the brain related to emotions. In the human system, it is located in an area unrelated to emotion. Humans can communicate simply to communicate—without emotions. So, anatomically, this scenario does not work. This suggests that language was derived from gesture(humans communicated by gesture first and sound was attached later).

The important question for gestural theories is why there was a shift to vocalization. Various explanations have been proposed:

1. Human ancestors started to use more and more tools, meaning that their hands were occupied and could no longer be used for gesturing.
2. Manual gesturing requires that speakers and listeners be visible to one another. In many situations, they might need to communicate even without visual contact—for example, after nightfall or when foliage obstructs visibility.
3. A composite hypothesis holds that early language took the form of part gestural and part vocal mimesis (imitative "song-and-dance"), combining modalities because all signals (like those of nonhuman apes and monkeys) still needed to be costly in order to be intrinsically convincing. In that event, each multi-media display would have needed not just to disambiguate an intended meaning but also to inspire confidence in the signal's reliability. The suggestion is that only once community-wide contractual understandings had come into force could trust in communicative intentions be automatically assumed, at last allowing Homo sapiens to shift to a more efficient default format. Since vocal distinctive features (sound contrasts) are ideal for this purpose, it was only at this point—when intrinsically persuasive body-language was no longer required to convey each message—that the decisive shift from manual gesture to the primary reliance on spoken language occurred.

A comparable hypothesis states that in "articulate" language, gesture and vocalization are intrinsically linked, as language evolved from equally intrinsically linked dance and song.

Humans still use manual and facial gestures when they speak, especially when people meet who have no language in common. There are also a great number of sign languages still in existence, commonly associated with Deaf communities. These sign languages are equal in complexity, sophistication, and expressive power to any oral language. The cognitive functions are similar and the parts of the brain used are similar. The main difference is that the "phonemes" are produced on the outside of the body, articulated with hands, body, and facial expression, rather than inside the body, articulated with tongue, teeth, lips, and breathing. (Compare the motor theory of speech perception.)

Critics of gestural theory note that it is difficult to name serious reasons why the initial pitch-based vocal communication (which is present in primates) would be abandoned in favor of the much less effective non-vocal, gestural communication. However, Michael Corballis has pointed out that it is supposed that primate vocal communication (such as alarm calls) cannot be controlled consciously, unlike hand movement, and thus it is not credible as precursor to human language; primate vocalization is rather homologous to and continued in involuntary reflexes (connected with basic human emotions) such as screams or laughter (the fact that these can be faked does not disprove the fact that genuine involuntary responses to fear or surprise exist). Also, gesture is not generally less effective, and depending on the situation can even be advantageous, for example, in a loud environment or where it is important to be silent, such as on a hunt. Other challenges to the "gesture-first" theory have been presented by researchers in psycholinguistics, including David McNeill.

=== Tool-use associated sound in the evolution of language ===
Proponents of the motor theory of language evolution have primarily focused on the visual domain and communication through observation of movements. The Tool-use sound hypothesis suggests that the production and perception of sound also contributed substantially, particularly incidental sound of locomotion (ISOL) and tool-use sound (TUS). Human bipedalism resulted in rhythmic and more predictable ISOL. That may have stimulated the evolution of musical abilities, auditory working memory, and abilities to produce complex vocalizations, and to mimic natural sounds. Since the human brain proficiently extracts information about objects and events from the sounds they produce, TUS, and mimicry of TUS, might have achieved an iconic function. The prevalence of sound symbolism in many extant languages supports this idea. Self-produced TUS activates multimodal brain processing (motor neurons, hearing, proprioception, touch, vision), and TUS stimulates primate audiovisual mirror neurons, which is likely to stimulate the development of association chains. Tool use and auditory gestures involve motor-processing of the forelimbs, which is associated with the evolution of vertebrate vocal communication. The production, perception, and mimicry of TUS may have resulted in a limited number of vocalizations or protowords that were associated with tool use. A new way to communicate about tools, especially when out of sight, would have had selective advantage. A gradual change in acoustic properties, meaning, or both could have resulted in arbitrariness and an expanded repertoire of words. Humans have been increasingly exposed to TUS over millions of years, coinciding with the period during which spoken language evolved.

=== Mirror neurons and language origins ===
In humans, functional MRI studies have reported finding areas homologous to the monkey mirror neuron system in the inferior frontal cortex, close to Broca's area, one of the language regions of the brain. This has led to suggestions that human language evolved from a gesture performance/understanding system implemented in mirror neurons. Mirror neurons have been said to have the potential to provide a mechanism for action-understanding, imitation-learning, and the simulation of other people's behavior. This hypothesis is supported by some cytoarchitectonic homologies between monkey premotor area F5 and human Broca's area.

Rates of vocabulary expansion link to the ability of children to vocally mirror non-words and so to acquire the new word pronunciations. Such speech repetition occurs automatically, quickly and separately in the brain to speech perception. Moreover, such vocal imitation can occur without comprehension such as in speech shadowing and echolalia. Further evidence for this link comes from a 2010 study in which the brain activity of two participants was measured using fMRI while they were gesturing words to each other using hand gestures with a game of charades—a modality that some have suggested might represent the evolutionary precursor of human language. Analysis of the data using Granger Causality revealed that the mirror-neuron system of the observer indeed reflects the pattern of activity of in the motor system of the sender, supporting the idea that the motor concept associated with the words is indeed transmitted from one brain to another using the mirror system.

Not all linguists agree with the above arguments, however. In particular, supporters of Noam Chomsky argue against the possibility that the mirror neuron system can play any role in the hierarchical recursive structures essential to syntax.

=== Putting-down-the-baby theory ===
According to Dean Falk's "putting-down-the-baby" theory, vocal interactions between early hominid mothers and infants began a sequence of events that led, eventually, to human ancestors' earliest words. The basic idea is that evolving human mothers, unlike their counterparts in other primates, could not move around and forage with their infants clinging onto their backs. Loss of fur in the human case left infants with no means of clinging on. Frequently, therefore, mothers had to put their babies down. As a result, these babies needed to be reassured that they were not being abandoned. Mothers responded by developing 'motherese'—an infant-directed communicative system embracing facial expressions, body language, touching, patting, caressing, laughter, tickling, and emotionally expressive contact calls. The argument is that language developed out of this interaction.

In The Mental and Social Life of Babies, psychologist Kenneth Kaye noted that no usable adult language could have evolved without interactive communication between very young children and adults. "No symbolic system could have survived from one generation to the next if it could not have been easily acquired by young children under their normal conditions of social life."

=== From-where-to-what theory ===
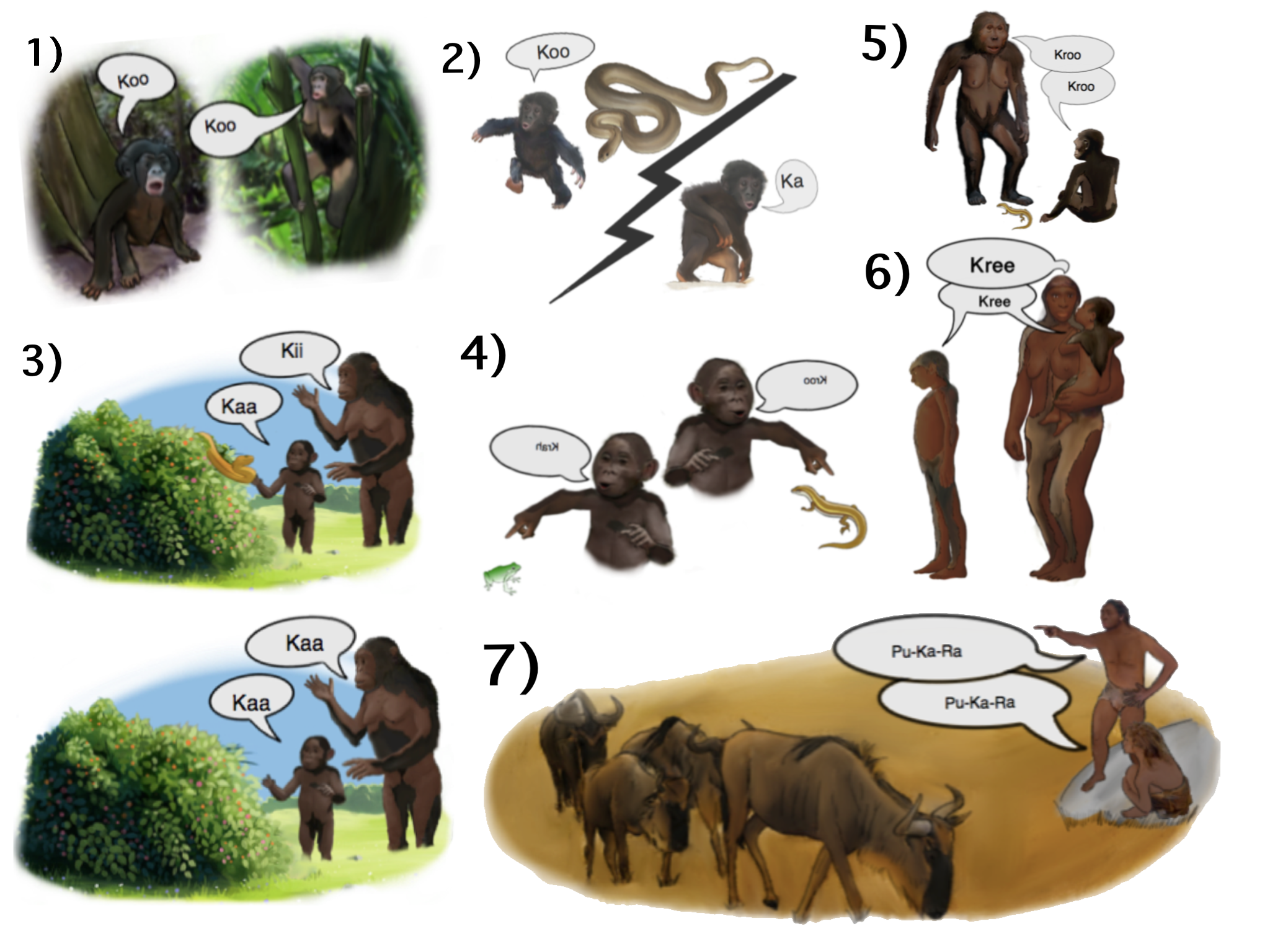
An illustration of the "from where to what" model of language evolution

The "from where to what" model is a language evolution model that is derived primarily from the organization of language processing in the brain into two structures: the auditory dorsal stream and the auditory ventral stream. It hypothesizes seven stages of language evolution (see illustration). Speech originated for the purpose of exchanging contact calls between mothers and their offspring to find one another in the event they became separated (illustration part 1). The contact calls could be modified with intonations in order to express either a higher or lower level of distress (illustration part 2). The use of two types of contact calls enabled the first question-answer conversation. In this scenario, the child would emit a low-level distress call to express a desire to interact with an object, and the mother would respond with either another low-level distress call (to express approval of the interaction) or a high-level distress call (to express disapproval) (illustration part 3). Over time, the improved use of intonations and vocal control led to the invention of unique calls (phonemes) associated with distinct objects (illustration part 4). At first, children learned the calls (phonemes) from their parents by imitating their lip-movements (illustration part 5). Eventually, infants were able to encode into long-term memory all the calls (phonemes). Consequentially, mimicry via lip-reading was limited to infancy and older children learned new calls through mimicry without lip-reading (illustration part 6). Once individuals became capable of producing a sequence of calls, this allowed multi-syllabic words, which increased the size of their vocabulary (illustration part 7). The use of words, composed of sequences of syllables, provided the infrastructure for communicating with sequences of words (i.e. sentences).

The theory's name is derived from the two auditory streams, which are both found in the brains of humans and other primates. The auditory ventral stream is responsible for sound recognition, and so it is referred to as the auditory what stream. In primates, the auditory dorsal stream is responsible for sound localization, and thus it is called the auditory where stream. Only in humans (in the left hemisphere) is it also responsible for other processes associated with language use and acquisition, such as speech repetition and production, integration of phonemes with their lip movements, perception and production of intonations, phonological long-term memory (long-term memory storage of the sounds of words), and phonological working memory (the temporary storage of the sounds of words). Some evidence also indicates a role in recognizing others by their voices. The emergence of each of these functions in the auditory dorsal stream represents an intermediate stage in the evolution of language.

A contact call origin for human language is consistent with animal studies, as like human language, contact call discrimination in monkeys is lateralised to the left hemisphere. Mice with knock-out to language related genes (such as FOXP2 and SRPX2) also resulted in the pups no longer emitting contact calls when separated from their mothers. Supporting this model is also its ability to explain unique human phenomena, such as the use of intonations when converting words into commands and questions, the tendency of infants to mimic vocalizations during the first year of life (and its disappearance later on) and the protruding and visible human lips, which are not found in other apes. This theory could be considered an elaboration of the putting-down-the-baby theory of language evolution.

=== Grammaticalization theory ===
"Grammaticalization" is a continuous historical process in which free-standing words develop into grammatical appendages, while these in turn become ever more specialized and grammatical. An initially "incorrect" usage, in becoming accepted, leads to unforeseen consequences, triggering knock-on effects and extended sequences of change. Paradoxically, grammar evolves because, in the final analysis, humans care less about grammatical niceties than about making themselves understood. If this is how grammar evolves today, according to this school of thought, similar principles at work can be legitimately inferred among distant human ancestors, when grammar itself was first being established.

In order to reconstruct the evolutionary transition from early language to languages with complex grammars, it is necessary to know which hypothetical sequences are plausible and which are not. In order to convey abstract ideas, the first recourse of speakers is to fall back on immediately recognizable concrete imagery, very often deploying metaphors rooted in shared bodily experience. A familiar example is the use of concrete terms such as "belly" or "back" to convey abstract meanings such as "inside" or "behind". Equally metaphorical is the strategy of representing temporal patterns on the model of spatial ones. For example, in the English sentence "Exams are approaching," the word "approaching" literally describes movement in space, but here it is used to describe an event that will happen soon. From such examples it can be seen why grammaticalization is consistently unidirectional—from concrete to abstract meaning, not the other way around.

Grammaticalization theorists picture early language as simple, perhaps consisting only of nouns.^{p. 111} Even under that extreme theoretical assumption, however, it is difficult to imagine what would realistically have prevented people from using, say, "spear" as if it were a verb ("Spear that pig!"). People might have used their nouns as verbs or their verbs as nouns as occasion demanded. In short, while a noun-only language might seem theoretically possible, grammaticalization theory indicates that it cannot have remained fixed in that state for any length of time.

Creativity drives grammatical change. This presupposes a certain attitude on the part of listeners. Instead of punishing deviations from accepted usage, listeners must prioritise imaginative mind-reading. Imaginative creativity—emitting a leopard alarm when no leopard was present, for example—is not the kind of behaviour which, say, vervet monkeys would appreciate or reward. Creativity and reliability are incompatible demands; for "Machiavellian" primates as for animals generally, the overriding pressure is to demonstrate reliability. If humans escape these constraints, it is because in their case, listeners are primarily interested in mental states.

To focus on mental states is to accept fictions—inhabitants of the imagination—as potentially informative and interesting. An example is metaphor: a metaphor is, literally, a false statement. In Romeo and Juliet, Romeo declares "Juliet is the sun!". Juliet is a woman, not a ball of plasma in the sky, but human listeners are not (or not usually) pedants insistent on point-by-point factual accuracy. They want to know what the speaker has in mind. Grammaticalization is essentially based on metaphor. To outlaw its use would be to stop grammar from evolving and, by the same token, to exclude all possibility of expressing abstract thought.

A criticism of all this is that while grammaticalization theory might explain language change today, it does not satisfactorily address the more difficult challenge of explaining the initial transition from primate-style communication to language as it is known today. Rather, the theory assumes that language already exists. As Bernd Heine and Tania Kuteva acknowledge: "Grammaticalisation requires a linguistic system that is used regularly and frequently within a community of speakers and is passed on from one group of speakers to another". Outside modern humans, such conditions do not prevail.

=== Evolution-progression model ===
Human language is used for self-expression; however, expression displays different stages. The consciousness of self and feelings represents the stage immediately prior to the external, phonetic expression of feelings in the form of sound (i.e. language). Intelligent animals such as dolphins, Eurasian magpies, and chimpanzees live in communities, wherein they assign themselves roles for group survival and show emotions such as sympathy. When such animals view their reflection (mirror test), they recognize themselves and exhibit self-consciousness. Notably, humans evolved in a quite different environment than that of these animals. Human survival became easier with the development of tools, shelter, and fire, thus facilitating further advancement of social interaction, self-expression, and tool-making, as for hunting and gathering. The increasing brain size allowed advanced provisioning and tools and the technological advances during the Palaeolithic era that built upon the previous evolutionary innovations of bipedalism and hand versatility allowed the development of human language.

=== Self-domesticated ape theory ===
According to a study investigating the song differences between white-rumped munias and its domesticated counterpart (Bengalese finch), the wild munias use a highly stereotyped song sequence, whereas the domesticated ones sing a highly unconstrained song. In wild finches, song syntax is subject to female preference—sexual selection—and remains relatively fixed. However, in the Bengalese finch, natural selection is replaced by breeding, in this case for colorful plumage, and thus, decoupled from selective pressures, stereotyped song syntax is allowed to drift. It is replaced, supposedly within 1000 generations, by a variable and learned sequence. Wild finches, moreover, are thought incapable of learning song sequences from other finches. In the field of bird vocalization, brains capable of producing only an innate song have very simple neural pathways: the primary forebrain motor centre, called the robust nucleus of arcopallium, connects to midbrain vocal outputs, which in turn project to brainstem motor nuclei. By contrast, in brains capable of learning songs, the arcopallium receives input from numerous additional forebrain regions, including those involved in learning and social experience. Control over song generation has become less constrained, more distributed, and more flexible.

One way to think about human evolution is that humans are self-domesticated apes. Just as domestication relaxed selection for stereotypic songs in the finches—mate choice was supplanted by choices made by the aesthetic sensibilities of bird breeders and their customers—so might human cultural domestication have relaxed selection on many of their primate behavioural traits, allowing old pathways to degenerate and reconfigure. Given the highly indeterminate way that mammalian brains develop—they basically construct themselves "bottom up", with one set of neuronal interactions preparing for the next round of interactions—degraded pathways would tend to seek out and find new opportunities for synaptic hookups. Such inherited de-differentiations of brain pathways might have contributed to the functional complexity that characterises human language. And, as exemplified by the finches, such de-differentiations can occur in very rapid time-frames.

== Speech and language for communication ==
A distinction can be drawn between speech and language. Language is not necessarily spoken: it might alternatively be written or signed. Speech is among a number of different methods of encoding and transmitting linguistic information, albeit arguably the most natural one.

Some scholars, such as Noam Chomsky, view language as an initially cognitive development, its "externalisation" to serve communicative purposes occurring later in human evolution. According to one such school of thought, the key feature distinguishing human language is recursion, (in this context, the iterative embedding of phrases within phrases). Other scholars—notably Daniel Everett—deny that recursion is universal, citing certain languages (e.g. Pirahã) which allegedly lack this feature.

The ability to ask questions is considered by some to distinguish language from non-human systems of communication. Some captive primates (notably bonobos and chimpanzees), having learned to use rudimentary signing to communicate with their human trainers, proved able to respond correctly to complex questions and requests. Yet they failed to ask even the simplest questions themselves. Conversely, human children are able to ask their first questions (using only question intonation) at the babbling period of their development, long before they start using syntactic structures. Although babies from different cultures acquire native languages from their social environment, most languages of the world use similar rising "question intonation" for yes–no questions. This fact is a strong evidence of the universality of question intonation. In general, according to some authors, sentence intonation/pitch is pivotal in spoken grammar and is the basic information used by children to learn the grammar of whatever language.

== Cognitive development and language ==
Language users have high-level reference (or deixis)—the ability to refer to things or states of being that are not in the immediate realm of the speaker. This ability is often related to theory of mind, or an awareness of the other as a being like the self with individual wants and intentions. According to Chomsky, Hauser and Fitch (2002), there are six main aspects of this high-level reference system:

- Theory of mind
- Capacity to acquire non-linguistic conceptual representations, such as the object/kind distinction
- Referential vocal signals
- Imitation as a rational, intentional system
- Voluntary control over signal production as evidence of intentional communication
- Number representation

=== Theory of mind ===
Simon Baron-Cohen (1999) argues that theory of mind must have preceded language use, based on evidence of use of the following characteristics as much as 40,000 years ago: intentional communication, repairing failed communication, teaching, intentional persuasion, intentional deception, building shared plans and goals, intentional sharing of focus or topic, and pretending. Moreover, Baron-Cohen argues that many primates show some, but not all, of these abilities. Call and Tomasello's research on chimpanzees supports this, in that individual chimps seem to understand that other chimps have awareness, knowledge, and intention, but do not seem to understand false beliefs. Many primates show some tendencies toward a theory of mind, but not a full one as humans have.

Ultimately, there is some consensus within the field that a theory of mind is necessary for language use. Thus, the development of a full theory of mind in humans was a necessary precursor to full language use.

=== Number representation ===
In one particular study, rats and pigeons were required to press a button a certain number of times to get food. The animals showed very accurate distinction for numbers less than four, but as the numbers increased, the error rate increased. In another, the primatologist Tetsuro Matsuzawa attempted to teach chimpanzees Arabic numerals. The difference between primates and humans in this regard was very large, as it took the chimps thousands of trials to learn 1–9, with each number requiring a similar amount of training time; yet, after learning the meaning of 1, 2 and 3 (and sometimes 4), children (after the age of 5.5 to 6) easily comprehend the value of greater integers by using a successor function (i.e. 2 is 1 greater than 1, 3 is 1 greater than 2, 4 is 1 greater than 3; once 4 is reached it seems most children suddenly understand that the value of any integer n is 1 greater than the previous integer). Put simply, other primates learn the meaning of numbers one by one, similar to their approach to other referential symbols, while children first learn an arbitrary list of symbols (1, 2, 3, 4...) and then later learn their precise meanings. These results can be seen as evidence for the application of the "open-ended generative property" of language in human numeral cognition.

== Linguistic structures ==
=== Lexical-phonological principle ===
Hockett (1966) details a list of features regarded as essential to describing human language. In the domain of the lexical-phonological principle, two features of this list are most important:

- Productivity: users can create and understand completely novel messages.
  - New messages are freely coined by blending, analogizing from, or transforming old ones.
  - Either new or old elements are freely assigned new semantic loads by circumstances and context. This says that in every language, new idioms constantly come into existence.
- Duality (of Patterning): a large number of meaningful elements are made up of a conveniently small number of independently meaningless yet message-differentiating elements.

The sound system of a language is composed of a finite set of simple phonological items. Under the specific phonotactic rules of a given language, these items can be recombined and concatenated, giving rise to morphology and the open-ended lexicon. A key feature of language is that a simple, finite set of phonological items gives rise to an infinite lexical system wherein rules determine the form of each item, and meaning is inextricably linked with form. Phonological syntax, then, is a simple combination of pre-existing phonological units. Related to this is another essential feature of human language: lexical syntax, wherein pre-existing units are combined, giving rise to semantically novel or distinct lexical items.

Certain elements of the lexical-phonological principle are known to exist outside of humans. While all (or nearly all) have been documented in some form in the natural world, very few coexist within the same species. Bird-song, singing nonhuman apes, and the songs of whales all display phonological syntax, combining units of sound into larger structures apparently devoid of enhanced or novel meaning. Certain other primate species do have simple phonological systems with units referring to entities in the world. However, in contrast to human systems, the units in these primates' systems normally occur in isolation, betraying a lack of lexical syntax. Philippe Schlenker et al. wrote a paper in 2014 giving evidence to suggest that Campbell's monkeys also display lexical syntax, combining two calls (a predator alarm call with a "boom", the combination of which denotes a lessened threat of danger), however it is still unclear whether this is a lexical or a morphological phenomenon.

=== Pidgins and creoles ===
Pidgins are significantly simplified languages with only rudimentary grammar and a restricted vocabulary. In their early stage, pidgins mainly consist of nouns, verbs, and adjectives with few or no articles, prepositions, conjunctions or auxiliary verbs. Often the grammar has no fixed word order and the words have no inflection.

If contact is maintained between the groups speaking the pidgin for long periods of time, the pidgins may become more complex over many generations. If the children of one generation adopt the pidgin as their native language it develops into a creole language, which becomes fixed and acquires a more complex grammar, with fixed phonology, syntax, morphology, and syntactic embedding. The syntax and morphology of such languages may often have local innovations not obviously derived from any of the parent languages.

Studies of creole languages around the world have suggested that they display remarkable similarities in grammar and are developed uniformly from pidgins in a single generation. These similarities are apparent even when creoles do not have any common language origins. In addition, creoles are similar, despite being developed in isolation from each other. Syntactic similarities include subject–verb–object word order. Even when creoles are derived from languages with a different word order they often develop the SVO word order. Creoles tend to have similar usage patterns for definite and indefinite articles, and similar movement rules for phrase structures even when the parent languages do not.

== Evolutionary timeline ==
Hominin timeline
← / Earlier apes; ← / Gorilla split; ← / Chimpanzee split; ← / Earliest bipedal; ← / Earliest sign of Ardipithecus; ← / Earliest sign of Australopithecus; ← / Earliest stone tools; ← / Earliest sign of Homo; ← / Dispersal beyond Africa; ← / Earliest fire / cooking; ← / Earliest rock art; ← / Earliest clothes; ← / Modern humans
(million years ago)

=== Primate communication ===
Field primatologists can give useful insights into great ape communication in the wild. One notable finding is that nonhuman primates, including the other great apes, produce calls that are graded, as opposed to categorically differentiated, with listeners striving to evaluate subtle gradations in signallers' emotional and bodily states. Nonhuman apes seemingly find it extremely difficult to produce vocalisations in the absence of the corresponding emotional states. In captivity, nonhuman apes have been taught rudimentary forms of sign language or have been persuaded to use lexigrams—symbols that do not graphically resemble the corresponding words—on computer keyboards. Some nonhuman apes, such as Kanzi, have been able to learn and use hundreds of lexigrams.

The Broca's and Wernicke's areas in the primate brain are responsible for controlling the muscles of the face, tongue, mouth, and larynx, as well as recognizing sounds. Primates are known to make "vocal calls", and these calls are generated by circuits in the brainstem and limbic system.

In the wild, the communication of vervet monkeys has been the most extensively studied. They are known to make up to ten different vocalizations. Many of these are used to warn other members of the group about approaching predators. They include a "leopard call", a "snake call", and an "eagle call". Each call triggers a different defensive strategy in the monkeys who hear the call and scientists were able to elicit predictable responses from the monkeys using loudspeakers and prerecorded sounds. Other vocalisations may be used for identification. If an infant monkey calls, its mother turns toward it, but other vervet mothers turn instead toward that infant's mother to see what she will do.

Similarly, researchers have demonstrated that chimpanzees (in captivity) use different "words" in reference to different foods. They recorded vocalisations that chimps made in reference, for example, to grapes, and then other chimps pointed at pictures of grapes when they heard the recorded sound.

=== Ardipithecus ramidus ===
A study published in Homo: Journal of Comparative Human Biology in 2017 claims that Ardipithecus ramidus, a hominin dated at approximately 4.5 Ma, shows the first evidence of an anatomical shift in the hominin lineage suggestive of increased vocal capability. This study compared the skull of A. ramidus with 29 chimpanzee skulls of different ages and found that in numerous features A. ramidus clustered with the infant and juvenile measures as opposed to the adult measures. Such affinity with the shape dimensions of infant and juvenile chimpanzee skull architecture, it was argued, may have resulted in greater vocal capability. This assertion was based on the notion that the chimpanzee vocal tract ratios that prevent speech are a result of growth factors associated with puberty—growth factors absent in A. ramidus ontogeny. A. ramidus was also found to have a degree of cervical lordosis more conducive to vocal modulation when compared with chimpanzees as well as cranial base architecture suggestive of increased vocal capability.

What was significant in this study, according to the authors, was the observation that the changes in skull architecture that correlate with reduced aggression are the same changes necessary for the evolution of early hominin vocal ability. In integrating data on anatomical correlates of primate mating and social systems with studies of skull and vocal tract architecture that facilitate speech production, the authors argue that paleoanthropologists prior to their study have failed to understand the important relationship between early hominin social evolution and the evolution of our species' capacities for language.

While the skull of A. ramidus, according to the authors, lacks the anatomical impediments to speech evident in chimpanzees, it is unclear what the vocal capabilities of this early hominin were. While they suggest A. ramidus—based on similar vocal tract ratios—may have had vocal capabilities equivalent to a modern human infant or very young child, they concede this is a debatable and speculative hypothesis. However, they do claim that changes in skull architecture through processes of social selection were a necessary prerequisite for language evolution. As they write:

We propose that as a result of paedomorphic morphogenesis of the cranial base and craniofacial morphology Ar. ramidus would have not been limited in terms of the mechanical components of speech production as chimpanzees and bonobos are. It is possible that Ar. ramidus had vocal capability approximating that of chimpanzees and bonobos, with its idiosyncratic skull morphology not resulting in any significant advances in speech capability. In this sense the anatomical features analysed in this essay would have been exapted in later more voluble species of hominin. However, given the selective advantages of pro-social vocal synchrony, we suggest the species would have developed significantly more complex vocal abilities than chimpanzees and bonobos.

=== Early Homo ===
Anatomically, some scholars believe that features of bipedalism developed in the australopithecines around 3.5 million years ago. Around this time, these structural developments within the skull led to a more prominently L-shaped vocal tract. In order to generate the sounds modern Homo sapiens are capable of making, such as vowels, it is vital that Early Homo populations must have a specifically shaped voice track and a lower sitting larynx. Opposing research previously suggested that Neanderthals were physically incapable of creating the full range of vocals seen in modern humans due to the differences in larynx placement. Establishing distinct larynx positions through fossil remains of Homo sapiens and Neanderthals would support this theory; however, modern research has revealed that the hyoid bone was indistinguishable in the two populations. Though research has shown a lower sitting larynx is important to producing speech, another theory states it may not be as important as once thought. Cataldo, Migliano, and Vinicius report speech alone appears inadequate for transmitting stone tool-making knowledge, and suggest that speech may have emerged due to an increase in complex social interactions.

=== Archaic Homo sapiens ===
Steven Mithen proposed the term Hmmmmm for the pre-linguistic system of communication posited to have been used by archaic Homo, beginning with Homo ergaster and reaching the highest sophistication in the Middle Pleistocene with Homo heidelbergensis and Homo neanderthalensis. Hmmmmm is an acronym for holistic (non-compositional), manipulative (utterances are commands or suggestions, not descriptive statements), multi-modal (acoustic as well as gestural and facial), musical, and mimetic.

==== Homo erectus ====
Evidence for Homo erectus potentially using language comes in the form of Acheulean tool usage. The use of abstract thought in the formation of Acheulean hand axes coincides with the symbol creation necessary for simple language. Recent language theories present recursion as the unique facet of human language and theory of mind. However, breaking down language into its symbolic parts: separating meaning from the requirements of grammar, it becomes possible to see that language does not depend on either recursion or grammar. This can be evidenced by the Pirahã language users in Brazil that have no myth or creation stories, no numbers and no colors within their language. This is to highlight that even though grammar may have been unavailable, use of foresight, planning and symbolic thought can be evidence of language as early as one million years ago with Homo erectus.

==== Homo heidelbergensis ====
Homo heidelbergensis was a close relative (most probably a migratory descendant) of Homo ergaster. Some researchers believe this species to be the first hominin to make controlled vocalisations, possibly mimicking animal vocalisations, and that as Homo heidelbergensis developed more sophisticated culture, proceeded from this point and possibly developed an early form of symbolic language.

==== Homo neanderthalensis ====
The discovery in 1989 of the (Neanderthal) Kebara 2 hyoid bone suggests that Neanderthals may have been anatomically capable of producing sounds similar to modern humans. The hypoglossal nerve, which passes through the hypoglossal canal, controls the movements of the tongue, which may have enabled voicing for size exaggeration (see size exaggeration hypothesis below) or may reflect speech abilities.

However, although Neanderthals may have been anatomically able to speak, Richard G. Klein in 2004 doubted that they possessed a fully modern language. He largely bases his doubts on the fossil record of archaic humans and their stone tool kit. Bart de Boer in 2017 acknowledges this ambiguity of a universally accepted Neanderthal vocal tract; however, he notes the similarities in the thoracic vertebral canal, potential air sacs, and hyoid bones between modern humans and Neanderthals to suggest the presence of complex speech. For two million years following the emergence of Homo habilis, the stone tool technology of hominins changed very little. Klein, who has worked extensively on ancient stone tools, describes the crude stone tool kit of archaic humans as impossible to break down into categories based on their function, and reports that Neanderthals seem to have had little concern for the final aesthetic form of their tools. Klein argues that the Neanderthal brain may have not reached the level of complexity required for modern speech, even if the physical apparatus for speech production was well-developed. The issue of the Neanderthal's level of cultural and technological sophistication remains a controversial one.

Based on computer simulations used to evaluate that evolution of language that resulted in showing three stages in the evolution of syntax, Neanderthals are thought to have been in stage 2, showing they had something more evolved than proto-language but not quite as complex as the language of modern humans.

Some researchers, applying auditory bioengineering models to computerised tomography scans of Neanderthal skulls, have asserted that Neanderthals had auditory capacity very similar to that of anatomically modern humans. These researchers claim that this finding implies that "Neanderthals evolved the auditory capacities to support a vocal communication system as efficient as modern human speech."

=== Homo sapiens ===
Anatomically modern humans begin to appear in the fossil record in Ethiopia some 200,000 years ago. Although there is still much debate as to whether behavioural modernity emerged in Africa at around the same time, a growing number of archaeologists nowadays invoke the southern African Middle Stone Age use of red ochre pigments—for example at Blombos Cave—as evidence that modern anatomy and behaviour co-evolved. These archaeologists argue strongly that if modern humans at this early stage were using red ochre pigments for ritual and symbolic purposes, they probably had symbolic language as well.

According to the recent African origins hypothesis, from around 60,000 – 50,000 years ago a group of humans left Africa and began migrating to occupy the rest of the world, carrying language and symbolic culture with them.

=== Descended larynx ===
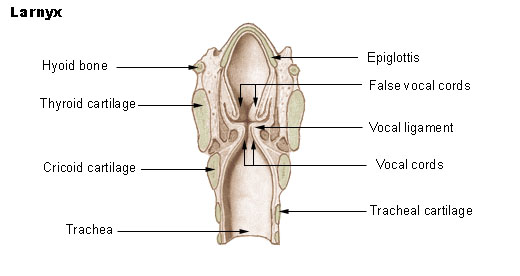

The larynx (or voice box) is an organ in the neck housing the vocal folds, which are responsible for phonation. In humans, the larynx is descended. The human species is not unique in this respect: goats, dogs, pigs and tamarins lower the larynx temporarily, to emit loud calls. Several deer species have a permanently lowered larynx, which may be lowered still further by males during their roaring displays. Lions, jaguars, cheetahs and domestic cats also do this. However, laryngeal descent in nonhumans (according to Philip Lieberman) is not accompanied by descent of the hyoid; hence the tongue remains horizontal in the oral cavity, preventing it from acting as a pharyngeal articulator.

Larynx
- Anatomy of the larynx, anterolateral view

Despite all this, scholars remain divided as to how "special" the human vocal tract really is. It has been shown that the larynx does descend to some extent during development in chimpanzees, followed by hyoidal descent. As against this, Philip Lieberman points out that only humans have evolved permanent and substantial laryngeal descent in association with hyoidal descent, resulting in a curved tongue and two-tube vocal tract with 1:1 proportions. He argues that Neanderthals and early anatomically modern humans could not have possessed supralaryngeal vocal tracts capable of producing "fully human speech". Uniquely in the human case, simple contact between the epiglottis and velum is no longer possible, disrupting the normal mammalian separation of the respiratory and digestive tracts during swallowing. Since this entails substantial costs—increasing the risk of choking while swallowing food—we are forced to ask what benefits might have outweighed those costs. The obvious benefit—so it is claimed—must have been speech. But this idea has been vigorously contested. One objection is that humans are in fact not seriously at risk of choking on food: medical statistics indicate that accidents of this kind are extremely rare. Another objection is that in the view of most scholars, speech as it is known emerged relatively late in human evolution, roughly contemporaneously with the emergence of Homo sapiens. A development as complex as the reconfiguration of the human vocal tract would have required much more time, implying an early date of origin. This discrepancy in timescales undermines the idea that human vocal flexibility was initially driven by selection pressures for speech, thus not excluding that it was selected for e.g. improved singing ability.

==== Size exaggeration hypothesis ====
To lower the larynx is to increase the length of the vocal tract, in turn lowering formant frequencies so that the voice sounds "deeper"—giving an impression of greater size. John Ohala argues that the function of the lowered larynx in humans, especially males, is probably to enhance threat displays rather than speech itself. Ohala points out that if the lowered larynx were an adaptation for speech, adult human males would be expected to be better adapted in this respect than adult females, whose larynx is considerably less low. However, females outperform males in verbal tests, falsifying this whole line of reasoning.

W. Tecumseh Fitch likewise argues that this was the original selective advantage of laryngeal lowering in the human species. Although (according to Fitch) the initial lowering of the larynx in humans had nothing to do with speech, the increased range of possible formant patterns was subsequently co-opted for speech. Size exaggeration remains the sole function of the extreme laryngeal descent observed in male deer. Consistent with the size exaggeration hypothesis, a second descent of the larynx occurs at puberty in humans, although only in males. In response to the objection that the larynx is descended in human females, Fitch suggests that mothers vocalizing to protect their infants would also have benefited from this ability.

=== Phonemic diversity ===
In 2011, Quentin Atkinson published a survey of phonemes from 500 different languages as well as language families and compared their phonemic diversity by region, number of speakers and distance from Africa. The survey revealed that African languages had the largest number of phonemes, and Oceania and South America had the smallest number. After allowing for the number of speakers, the phonemic diversity was compared to over 2000 possible origin locations. Atkinson's "best fit" model is that language originated in western, central, or southern Africa between 80,000 and 160,000 years ago. This predates the hypothesized southern coastal peopling of Arabia, India, southeast Asia, and Australia. It would also mean that the origin of language occurred at the same time as the emergence of symbolic culture.

Numerous linguists have criticized Atkinson's paper as misrepresenting both the phonemic data and processes of linguistic change, as language complexity does not necessarily correspond to age, and of failing to take into account the borrowing of phonemes from neighbouring languages, as some Bantu languages have done with click consonants. Recreations of his method gave possible origins of language in the Caucasus and Turkmenistan, in addition to southern and eastern Africa.

== History ==
=== In religion and mythology ===
The Tower of Babel by Pieter Bruegel the Elder (1563)

The search for the origin of language has a long history in mythology. Most mythologies do not credit humans with the invention of language but speak of a divine language predating human language. Mystical languages used to communicate with animals or spirits, such as the language of the birds, are also common, and were of particular interest during the Renaissance.

Vāc is the Hindu goddess of speech, or "speech personified". As Brahman's "sacred utterance", she has a cosmological role as the "Mother of the Vedas". The Aztecs' story maintains that only a man, Coxcox, and a woman, Xochiquetzal, survived a flood, having floated on a piece of bark. They found themselves on land and had many children who were at first born unable to speak, but subsequently, upon the arrival of a dove, were endowed with language, although each one was given a different speech such that they could not understand one another.

In the Old Testament, the Book of Genesis (chapter 11) says that God prevented the Tower of Babel from being completed through a miracle that made its construction workers start speaking different languages. After this, they migrated to other regions, grouped together according to which of the newly created languages they spoke, explaining the origins of languages and nations outside of the Fertile Crescent.

=== Historical experiments ===
History contains a number of anecdotes about people who attempted to discover the origin of language by experiment. The first such tale was told by Herodotus (Histories 2.2). He relates that Pharaoh Psammetichus (probably Psammetichus I, 7th century BC) had two children raised by a shepherd, with the instructions that no one should speak to them, but that the shepherd should feed and care for them while listening to determine their first words. When one of the children cried "bekos" with outstretched arms the shepherd concluded that the word was Phrygian, because that was the sound of the Phrygian word for 'bread'. From this, Psammetichus concluded that the first language was Phrygian. King James IV of Scotland is said to have tried a similar experiment; his children were supposed to have spoken Hebrew.

Both the medieval monarch Frederick II and Akbar are said to have tried similar experiments; the children involved in these experiments did not speak. The current situation of deaf people also points into this direction.

=== History of research ===
Modern linguistics did not begin until the late 18th century, and the Romantic or animist theses of Johann Gottfried Herder and Johann Christoph Adelung remained influential well into the 19th century. The question of language origin seemed inaccessible to methodical approaches, and in 1866 the Linguistic Society of Paris famously banned all discussion of the origin of language, deeming it to be an unanswerable problem. An increasingly systematic approach to historical linguistics developed in the course of the 19th century, reaching its culmination in the Neogrammarian school of Karl Brugmann and others.

However, scholarly interest in the question of the origin of language has only gradually been revived from the 1950s on (and then controversially) with ideas such as universal grammar, mass comparison and glottochronology.

The "origin of language" as a subject in its own right emerged from studies in neurolinguistics, psycholinguistics and human evolution. The Linguistic Bibliography introduced "Origin of language" as a separate heading in 1988, as a sub-topic of psycholinguistics. Dedicated research institutes of evolutionary linguistics are a recent phenomenon, emerging only in the 1990s.

== See also ==
- Abiogenesis
- Biolinguistics
- Bouba/kiki effect
- Bow-wow theory
- Digital infinity
- Essay on the Origin of Languages
- Evolutionary psychology of language
- FOXP2 and human evolution
- Generative anthropology
- Historical linguistics
- Linguistic monogenesis and polygenesis
- Neurobiological origins of language
- Origins of society
- Origin of speech
- Proto-language
- Theory of language
