= Essay on the Origin of Languages =

Essay by Jean-Jacques Rousseau

Essay on the Origin of Languages (French: Essai sur l'origine des langues) is an essay by Jean-Jacques Rousseau published posthumously in 1781. Rousseau had meant to publish the essay in a short volume which was also to include essays On Theatrical Imitation and The Levite of Ephraim. In the preface to this would-be volume, Rousseau wrote that the Essay was originally meant to be included in the Discourse on Inequality, but was omitted because it "was too long and out of place". The essay was mentioned in Rousseau's 1762 book, Emile, or On Education.

== Overview ==
In this text, Rousseau lays out a narrative of the beginnings of language, using a similar literary form as the Second Discourse. Rousseau writes that language (as well as the human race) developed in southern warm climates and then migrated northwards to colder climates. In its inception, language was musical and had emotional power as opposed to rational persuasion. The colder climates of the north, however, stripped language of its passionate characteristic, distorting it to the present rational form. In the later chapters, this relation is also discussed in terms of music, in ways that resonate with observations that Rousseau makes in his 1753 Letter on French Music.

Chapter Nine of the Essay is an explication of the development of humankind, eventually inventing language. As this format closely adheres to that of the Second Discourse, some have discussed whether one account ought to be read as more authoritative than the other. As the text was initially written in 1754, and was sent to the publisher in 1763, it appears safe to argue that the tensions between the Essay and the Second Discourse were intentional.

The third chapter of the second part of Jacques Derrida's Of Grammatology analyzes and critiques Rousseau's essay.

== See also ==
- Animal communication
- Biolinguistics
- Evolutionary anthropology
- Historical linguistics
- Human evolution
- Language acquisition
- Linguistic anthropology
- Linguistic universals
- Neurobiological origins of language
- Origins of society
- Origin of speech
- Physical anthropology
- Proto-language
- Proto-Human language
- Recent African origin of modern humans
- Signalling theory
- Sociocultural evolution
- Symbolic culture
- Universal grammar

== Sources ==
- Gourevitch, Victor. Rousseau: The Discourses and other early political writings. Cambridge University Press 1997
- Moran, John H., Gode, Alexander On the Origin of Language. University of Chicago Press 1986
- Derrida, Jacques. Spivak, Gayatri. Of Grammatology. Johns Hopkins Press 1998
