= Interjectional theory =

Early concept on the origin of language

Interjectional theory is a theory of language formulated by the pre-Socratic philosopher Democritus, ca. 460 BC to ca. 370 BC, who argued that human speech derives from a variety of sounds and outcries of an emotional nature. These ideas were later held by Epicurus and Lucretius who cited Democritus as their authority. The theory continued to influence the study of the origin of language into the 18th century when it was again put forward by Vico and Rousseau. Criticisms of this theory include, that it only explains the origins of interjections, that emotional expressions often include sounds not used in language, and that it does not explain the origin of nouns.

== See also ==
- Interjection
