= Payroll (film) =

1961 British crime thriller directed by Sidney Hayers

- UK movie poster
- Directed by: Sidney Hayers
- Written by: George Baxt
- Based on: Payroll by Derek Bickerton
- Produced by: Norman Priggen; Julian Wintle
- Starring: Michael Craig; Françoise Prévost; Billie Whitelaw; William Lucas
- Cinematography: Ernest Steward
- Edited by: Tristam Cones
- Music by: Reg Owen
- Production companies: Lynx; Independent Artists
- Distributed by: Anglo-Amalgamated Film Distributors
- Release dates: 20 April 1961 (London West End); 21 May 1961 (UK general release)
- Running time: 102 minutes
- Country: United Kingdom
- Language: English

Payroll is a 1961 British neo-noir crime thriller film directed by Sidney Hayers and starring Michael Craig, Françoise Prévost, and Billie Whitelaw. The screenplay by George Baxt was adapted from Derek Bickerton's 1959 novel of the same name. The film revolves around a group of criminals who plan and execute a wages robbery, which ultimately ends in disaster. The movie is one of the most highly regarded crime films from Anglo-Amalgamated.

== Plot ==
Four crooks, Johnny Mellors, Monty, Blackie, and Bert, devise a plan to rob a payroll van with the assistance of Dennis Pearson, an accountant working at the targeted firm. Pearson is compelled to support his wife Katie, who desires a more luxurious lifestyle. During the heist, the van driver Harry Parker, is killed, and Bert sustains a fatal injury from Parker's colleague, Frank Moore. Despite the setbacks, the gang successfully escapes with £50,000.

Having found out that Pearson was the 'inside man', Parker's widow Jackie starts posting threatening letters to him. Katie in the meantime has become involved with Johnny, hoping to get some of the money for herself. As the gang members start to argue amongst themselves, they are pursued by both Katie and Jackie, as well as the police. The climax takes place in Norfolk, with Johnny and Katie double-crossing each other and Jackie tracking Johnny in her bid for revenge.

== Cast ==
- Michael Craig as Johnny Mellors
- Françoise Prévost as Katie Pearson
- Billie Whitelaw as Jackie Parker
- William Lucas as Dennis Pearson
- Kenneth Griffith as Monty Dunston
- Tom Bell as Blackie
- Barry Keegan as Bert Langridge
- Edward Cast as Detective Sergeant Bradden
- Andrew Faulds as Detective Inspector Carberry
- William Peacock as Harry Parker
- Glyn Houston as Frank Moore
- Joan Rice as Madge Moore
- Vanda Godsell as Doll
- Stanley Meadows as Bowen
- Brian McDermott as Brent
- Hugh Morton as Mr John
- Keith Faulkner as Alf
- Bruce Beeby as Worth
- Murray Evans as Billy
- Kevin Bennett as Archie Murdock
- Mary Laura Wood as Mrs Murdock
- Pauline Shepherd as secretary
- Paddy Edwards as Beryl
- Meadows White as Strange
- Michael Barrington as Hay
- Anthony Bate as detective (uncredited)
- Anita Sharp-Bolster as landlady (uncredited)

== Production ==
The film's working title was I Promised to Pay, and in some territories it remained the film's distribution title. Much of the film was shot on location in and around Gateshead and Newcastle upon Tyne. Other scenes were shot in Tynemouth, Rugby and Southwold; after location work was complete, the film began studio shooting at Beaconsfield Studios on 10 October 1960.

Michael Craig was loaned from Rank. Of Hayers he said: "I think he'd learned 'directing' from a manual".

== Theme music ==
The theme music, by Reg Owen and His Orchestra, was issued as a single on the Palette label (PG.9013).

The song "It Happens Every Day", sung in a nightclub scene in the film by Eddie Ellis, was composed by Tony Osborne and Norman Newell, and released as a single on the Parlophone label (R. 4749).

== Release ==
The film opened at the Plaza cinema in London's West End on 20 April 1961, and went into general release in the UK on 21 May 1961.

== Reception ==
=== Box office ===
The film was called a "money maker" at the British box office in 1961.

== Critical reception ==
The Monthly Film Bulletin said that Payroll, distinguished by the dour presence of Francoise Prévost, has ambitions beyond its second-feature credentials, and that the producers threw in just about every ingredient of classic melodrama. They said guilt complex is proclaimed as in German silent cinema and proficient actors William Lucas and Kenneth Griffith can do nothing to mitigate the film's lunacies. The Radio Times Guide to Films gave the film 2/5 stars, writing: "This is a solidly crafted crime story in which the perfect blag begins to unravel as the gang lies low. Michael Craig is on surprisingly good form ... but it's Billie Whitelaw ... who commands centre-stage as she risks her own life to snare the culprits."
