= Payroll (novel) =

1959 novel

- 1961 paperback edition
- Author: Derek Bickerton
- Language: English
- Genre: Crime
- Publisher: Eyre & Spottiswoode
- Publication date: 1959
- Publication place: United Kingdom
- Media type: Print
- Pages: 190

Payroll is a 1959 crime thriller novel by the British writer Derek Bickerton. Written while he was working in Barbados, it was the first of four novels he produced. The plot revolves around a gang of criminals who pull off a heist on the payroll of a Birmingham factory due to inside information from an accountant working there. The gang soon begin to fall out with each other, pursued by the avenging wife of one of the payroll guards who was killed in the robbery.

== Film adaptation ==
In 1961 it was made into a film of the same title directed by Sidney Hayers and starring Michael Craig, Françoise Prévost and Billie Whitelaw. The adaptation shifted the setting to Newcastle where much of the film was shot on location.

== Bibliography ==
- Byrne, Francis & Huebner, Thom. Development and Structures of Creole Languages: Essays in Honor of Derek Bickerton. John Benjamins Publishing, 1991.
- Goble, Alan. The Complete Index to Literary Sources in Film. Walter de Gruyter, 1999.
