= Theoretical linguistics =

Branch of linguistics which inquires into the nature of language

Theoretical linguistics, or general linguistics, is the branch of linguistics which inquires into the nature of language itself and seeks to answer fundamental questions as to what language is; how it works; how universal grammar (UG) as a domain-specific mental organ operates, if it exists at all; what its unique properties are; how language relates to other cognitive processes, etc. Theoretical linguists are most concerned with constructing models of linguistic knowledge and ultimately developing a linguistic theory.

Since the 1960s, the term "theoretical linguistics" has typically been used in more or less the same sense as "general linguistics", even though it also contrasts with applied linguistics, and even though it is often said that language description is inherently theoretical. The usual terminology is thus not entirely clear and consistent.

In the first half of the 20th century, the term "general linguistics" was more common (consider Ferdinand de Saussure's famous Course in General Linguistics), which could be contrasted with "language-particular linguistics" (which is more often called descriptive linguistics).

The fields that are generally considered the core of theoretical linguistics are phonology, morphology, syntax, and semantics. Although phonetics often guides phonology, it is often excluded from the purview of theoretical linguistics.

== Major fields ==
=== Morphology ===
Morphology is the study of the internal structure of words. For example, in the sentences The dog runs and The dogs run, the word forms runs and dogs have an affix -s added, distinguishing them from the base forms dog and run. Adding this suffix to a nominal stem gives plural forms, and adding it to verbal stems restricts the subject to third-person singular. Some morphological theories operate with two distinct suffixes -s, called allomorphs of the morphemes plural and third-person singular, respectively. Languages differ with respect to their morphological structure. Along one axis, analytic languages, with few or no affixes or other morphological processes, may be distinguished from synthetic languages, with many affixes. Along another axis, agglutinative languages, whose affixes express only one grammatical property and are added neatly one after another, may be distinguished from fusional languages, with non-concatenative morphological processes (infixation, umlaut, ablaut, etc.) and/or with less clear-cut affix boundaries.

=== Phonetics ===
Phonetics is the study of speech sounds that concentrates on three main points:

- Articulation: the production of speech sounds in human speech organs
- Perception: how human ears respond to speech signals and how the human brain analyses them
- Acoustic features: the physical characteristics of speech sounds and their loudness, amplitude, frequency, etc.

According to this definition, phonetics can also be called linguistic analysis of human speech at the surface level. That is one obvious difference from phonology, which concerns the structure and organisation of speech sounds in natural languages; it has a theoretical and abstract nature. One example can be made to illustrate the distinction:

In English, the suffix -s can represent /s/ or /z/ or it can be silent (notated Ø), depending on context.

==== Articulatory phonetics ====
Articulatory phonetics is a subfield of phonetics. In studying articulation, phoneticians attempt to document how humans produce speech sounds (vowels and consonants). That is, articulatory phoneticians are interested in how the different structures of the vocal tract, called the articulators (tongue, lips, jaw, palate, teeth, etc.), interact to create the specific sounds.

==== Auditory phonetics ====
Auditory phonetics is a branch of phonetics that is concerned with the hearing, acquisition, and comprehension of phonetic sounds of words of a language. As articulatory phonetics explores the methods of sound production, auditory phonetics explores the methods of reception: the ear to the brain and those processes.

==== Acoustic phonetics ====
Acoustic phonetics is the subfield of phonetics that deals with acoustic aspects of speech sounds. Acoustic phonetics investigates properties like the mean-squared amplitude of a waveform, its duration, its fundamental frequency or other properties of its frequency spectrum, and the relationship of those properties to other branches of phonetics (e.g. articulatory or auditory phonetics) and to abstract linguistic concepts, such as phones, phrases, or utterances.

=== Phonology ===
Phonology (sometimes called phonemics or phonematics) is the study of how sounds are used in languages to convey meaning. Phonology includes topics such as stress and intonation.

The basic unit of analysis for phonology is the phoneme, a group of sounds which are not distinguished by the rules of the language in determining meaning. In English, for example, [t] and [tʰ] are different allophones that represent the single phoneme /t/.

=== Semantics ===
Semantics is the study of intension, the intrinsic meanings of words and phrases. Much work in the field of philosophy of language is concerned with the relation between meanings and the word, and this concern cross-cuts formal semantics in several ways. For example, both philosophers of language and semanticists make use of propositional, predicate, and modal logics to express their ideas about word meaning.

=== Syntax ===
Syntax is the study of language structure and phrasal hierarchies, depicted in parse tree format. It is concerned with the relationship between units at the level of words or morphology. Syntax seeks to exactly delineate all and only those sentences which make up a given language, using native speakers' intuition. Syntax seeks to formally describe exactly how structural relations between elements (lexical items/words and operators) in a sentence contribute to its interpretation. Syntax uses principles of formal logic and set theory to formalize the hierarchical relationship between elements in a sentence. Abstract syntax trees are often used to illustrate the hierarchical structures that are posited. Thus, in active declarative sentences in English the subject is followed by the main verb which in turn is followed by the object (SVO). This order of elements is crucial to its correct interpretation and it is exactly this which syntacticians try to capture. They argue that there must be a formal computational component contained within the language faculty of normal speakers of a language and seek to describe it.

== See also ==
- Biolinguistics
- Cognitive science
- Computational linguistics
- Critical discourse analysis
- Digital infinity
- Discourse analysis
- Formal language
- Generative grammar
- Linguistic relativity
- Minimalist program
- Pragmatics
- Psycholinguistics
- Universal grammar
