= Neurobiological origins of language =

Language has a long evolutionary history and is closely related to the brain, but what makes the human brain uniquely adapted to language is unclear. The regions of the brain that are involved in language in humans have similar analogues in apes and monkeys, and yet they do not use language. There may also be a genetic component: mutations in the FOXP2 gene prevent humans from constructing complete sentences.

== Neurobiological adaptations for language ==
=== Broca's and Wernicke's areas ===
These regions are where language is located in the brain – everything from speech to reading and writing. Language itself is based on symbols used to represent concepts in the world, and this system appears to be housed in these areas. The language regions in human brains highly resemble similar regions in other primates, even though humans are the only species that use language.

The brain structures of chimpanzees are very similar to those of humans. Both contain Broca's and Wernicke's homologues that are involved in communication. Broca's area is largely used for planning and producing vocalizations in both chimpanzees and humans. Wernicke's area appears to be where linguistic representations and symbols are mapped to specific concepts. This functionality is present in both chimpanzees and humans; the chimpanzee Wernicke's area is much more similar to its human counterpart than is the Broca's area, suggesting that Wernicke's is more evolutionary ancient than Broca's.

=== Motor neurons ===
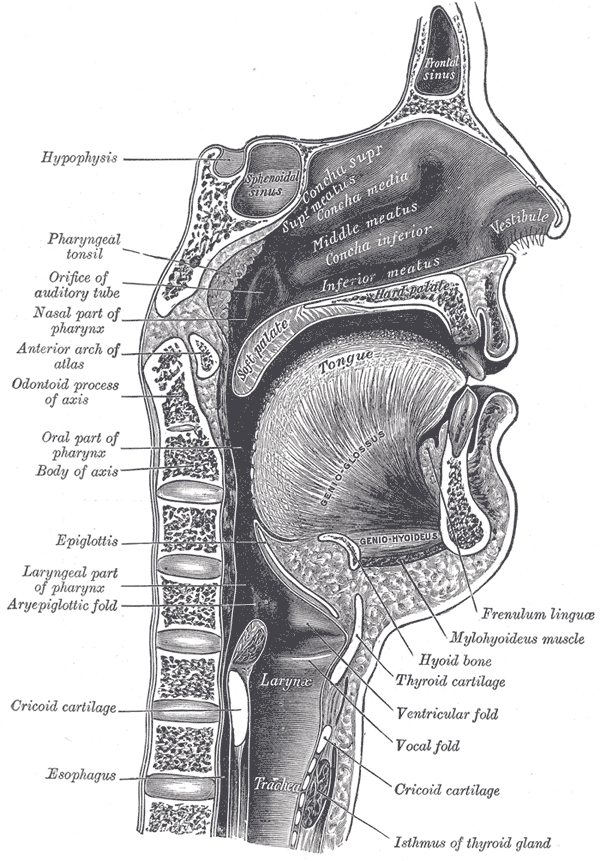
Sagittal section of human vocal tract

In order to speak, the breathing system must be voluntarily repurposed to produce vocal sounds, which allows the breathing mechanisms to be temporarily deactivated in favor of song or speech production. The human vocal tract has evolved to be more suited to speaking, with a lower larynx, 90° turn in the windpipe, and large, round tongue. Motor neurons in birds and humans bypass the unconscious systems in the brainstem to give direct control of the larynx to the brain.

== Theories of language origin ==
=== Gestural origin ===
The earliest language was strictly vocal; reading and writing came later. New research suggests that the combination of gestures and vocalizations may have led to the development of more complicated language in protohumans. Chimpanzees that produce attention-getting sounds show activation in areas of the brain that are highly similar to Broca's area in humans. Even hand and mouth movements with no vocalizations cause very similar activation patterns in the Broca's area of both humans and monkeys. When monkeys view other monkeys gesturing, mirror neurons in the Broca's homologue activate. Groups of mirror neurons are specialized to respond only to one kind of viewed action, and it is currently believed that these may be an evolutionary origin to the neurons that are adapted for speech processing and production.

=== Universal grammar ===
The language bioprogram hypothesis proposes that humans have an innate, cognitive grammatical structure allowing them to develop and understand language. According to this theory, this system is embedded in human genetics and underpins the basic grammar of all languages. Some evidence suggests that at least some of our linguistic capacities may be genetically controlled. Mutations in the FOXP2 gene prevent people from combining words and phrases into sentences. However, these genes are present in the heart, lungs, and brain, and their role is not entirely clear.

It is possible that the human capacity for grammar evolved from non-semantic behavior like singing. Birds have the ability to produce, process, and learn complex vocalizations, but the units of a birdsong, when removed from the larger meaning and context of the birdsong as a whole, have no inherent meaning. Early hominids may have evolved capacities for similar, non-semantic purposes, that were later modified for symbolic language.

== See also ==
- Language bioprogram theory
- Origin of language
