= Language bioprogram theory =

Linguistic theory of creole language innovations

The language bioprogram theory or language bioprogram hypothesis (LBH) is a theory arguing that the structural similarities between different creole languages cannot be solely attributed to their superstrate and substrate languages. As articulated mostly by Derek Bickerton, creolization occurs when the linguistic exposure of children in a community consists solely of a highly unstructured pidgin; these children use their innate language capacity to transform the pidgin, which characteristically has high syntactic variability, into a language with a highly structured grammar. As this capacity is universal, the grammars of these new languages have many similarities.

== Syntactic similarities ==
By comparing Hawaiian Creole, Haitian Creole and Sranan, Bickerton identified twelve features which he believed to be integral to any creole:Bickerton (1984)

- Sentence structure: subject–verb–object word order, with similar mechanisms for using word order to apply focus to one of these constituents.
- Articles: definite article applied to specific and identified noun phrase, indefinite article applied to specific and newly asserted noun phrase, and zero for nonspecific noun phrase.
- TMA (tense–modality–aspect) systems
- distinction of realized and unrealized complements
- relativization and subject-copying
- negation
- existential and possessive
- copula
- adjectives as verbs
- questions
- question words
- passive equivalents

Having analyzed these features, he believed that he was able to characterize, at least partly, the properties of innate grammar. In his LBH, Bickerton defined very precisely what he considers to be a creole: a language that has arisen out of a prior pidgin that had not existed for more than a generation and among a population where, at most, 20% were speakers of the dominant language and where the remaining 80% were linguistically diverse.

Bickerton puts emphasis on children's contribution to the development of a creole and the abrupt character of this process. For example, in Bickerton (1983), he exhibits ungrammatical utterances made by English-speaking children between the ages of two and four, and argues that they are very similar to perfectly grammatical sentences of English-based creole languages:

Child	Creole	
Where I can put it?	Where I can put om?	Hawaii
Daddy throw the nother rock	Daddy t'row one neda rock'tone	Jamaica
I go full Angela bucket	I go full Angela bucket	Guyana
Lookit a boy play ball	Luku one boy a play ball	Jamaica
Nobody don't like me	Nobody no like me	Guyana
I no like do that	I no like do that	Hawaii
Johnny big more than me	Johnny big more than me	Jamaica
Let Daddy get pen write it	Make Daddy get pen write am	Guyana
I more better than Johnny	I more better than Johnny	Hawaii

Normally, the grammar behind such utterances made by children is eventually altered as parents continue to model a grammar different from this innate one. Presumably, if such children were removed from exposure to English parents, their grammars would continue to be that of creole languages.

Thomason & Kaufman (1988) argue that this emphasis on child-input implies two different linguistic communities but that it is far simpler and more consistent with the data from multilingual communities to assume that the two groups form one speech community, and that both make contributions to the development of the emergent creole. Also, Singler (1986) points out that children were scarce on plantations, where creoles appeared, for several reasons, including absence of women as well as high rates of sterility, miscarriage, and infant mortality.

However, according to Mühlhäusler (1986), the differences between the speech of children and adults in Tok Pisin are so big that communication is drastically hindered.

== Verbal system ==
The verb conjugation is typically close to an ideal tense–modality–aspect pattern. In this system, the absence or presence of auxiliary verbs indicates tense (concurrent or anterior), modality (realis or irrealis) and aspect (punctual or progressive), and when present these auxiliaries occur in that order, and typically are based on similar meaning words in the pidgin or superstrate language. Thus anterior tense may be marked by words such as bin in English-based creoles (from been), or té in French-based creoles (from été), a future or subjunctive tense may be marked by go (from English go) or al (from French aller), and a non-punctual (non-stative) aspect by a word such as stei (from English stay).

Comparison of Creole Grammar
Verb Form	Nonstative			Stative		
	Hawaiian Creole	Haitian Creole	Sranan	Hawaiian Creole	Haitian Creole	Sranan
Base Form (he walked; he loves)	he walk	li mache	a waka	he love	li renmen	a lobi
Nonpunctual (he is/was walking)	he stay walk	l ap mache	a e waka			
Anterior (He had walked; he loved)	he bin walk	li te mache	a ben waka	he bin love	li te renmen	a ben lobi
Anterior + Nonpunctual (he was/had been walking)	he bin stay walk	li t ap mache	a ben e waka			
Irreal (He will/would walk;he will/would love)	he go walk	l av(a) mache	a sa waka	he go love	l av(a) renmen	a sa lobi
Irreal + Nonpunctual (he will/would be walking)	he go stay walk	l av ap mache	a sa e waka			
Anterior + Irreal (he would have walked/loved)	he bin go walk	li t av(a) mache	a ben sa waka	he bin go love	li t av(a) renmen	a ben sa lobi
Anterior + Irreal + Nonpunctual (he would have been walking)	he bin go stay walk	li t av ap mache	a ben sa e waka			

The above table demonstrates syntactic similarities of creole languages. Stative verbs are those that cannot form the nonpunctual aspect. According to Bickerton, all observed creole languages strictly follow a structure that has the anterior particle precede the irreal particle, and the irreal particle precede the nonpunctual particle, although in certain languages some compounded forms may be replaced by other constructions.

== Creole Prototype Theory ==
John McWhorter contributed to the LBH with his Creole Prototype Theory, which argues that creoles exhibit some features that may be used to distinguish them from other languages without referring to the socio-historical dimension. According to McWhorter (1992), creoles are much less likely than other languages:

1. to use grammatical inflection via affixing,
2. to develop productive, nontransparent derivational affixes, or
3. to use tone to mark lexical differences or as grammatical markers.

Those features do not appear in creoles, which are relatively young languages, but may appear later on in their grammars, after the languages had changed. McWhorter claims not that all creoles are ideal examples of the prototype but that they exhibit varying degrees of conformity with the prototype.

== Proposed empirical study ==
Bickerton proposed in 1976 an empirical test of his theory, which involved putting families speaking mutually unintelligible languages on a previously uninhabited island for three years. Federal funding for the test was obtained, but the experiment was cancelled over concerns that informed consent could not be obtained, given the breadth of unknown possible hazards of participation.

== Criticism ==
Several aspects of the LBH have attracted criticism. Siegel (2007) disputes some of Bickerton's claims about Hawai'i Creole, claiming that the linguistic input of the children was not impoverished, since it came from an expanded pidgin, not a rudimentary one. Siegel also claims the features of Hawai'i Creole are not that similar to other creoles and that the substrate languages (especially Cantonese and Portuguese) were a significant source of grammatical features. Siegel also makes the point that Hawai'i Creole emerged over two generations, not one.

Bickerton's definition excludes many languages that might be called creoles. Moreover, lack of historical data makes it often impossible to evaluate such claims. In addition, many of the creole languages that fit this definition do not display all the twelve features, while, according to Mühlhäusler (1986), the left-out creoles often display more of them. Another problem, raised by Mufwene (1986), is that if the same bioprogram was the starting point of all creoles, one must explain the differences between them, and language diversity in general, as the bioprogram is universal.

== See also ==
- Monogenetic theory of pidgins
- Origin of language
- Origin of speech
- Innateness hypothesis

== Bibliography ==
- Bickerton, Derek (1981), Roots of Language, Karoma Publishers, ISBN 0-89720-044-6
- Bickerton, Derek (1983), "Creole Languages", Scientific American, 249 (8): 116–122, Bibcode:1983SciAm.249a.116B, doi:10.1038/scientificamerican0783-116
- Bickerton, Derek (1984), "The Language Bioprogram Hypothesis", The Behavioral and Brain Sciences, 7 (2): 173–188, doi:10.1017/S0140525X00044149, S2CID 144264276
- Bickerton, Derek (1988), "Creole languages and the bioprogram", in Newmeyer, F.J. (ed.), Linguistics: The Cambridge survey, vol. 2, Cambridge: Cambridge University Press
- Bickerton, Derek (1991), "On the Supposed 'Gradualness' of Creole Development", Journal of Pidgin and Creole Languages, 6: 25–58, doi:10.1075/jpcl.6.1.03bic
- Hall, Robert (1966). Pidgin and Creole languages'. Ithaca: Cornell University Press. ISBN 9780801401732.
- McWhorter, John H. (1992), "Substratal influence in Saramaccan serial verb construction", Journal of Pidgin and Creole Languages, 4
- Mufwene, Salikoko (1986), "The Universalist and Substrate Hypotheses Complement One Another", in Muysken, Pieter; Smith, Norval (eds.), Substrata versus Universals in Creole Genesis, Amsterdam: Benjamins
- Mühlhäusler, Peter (1986), Pidgin and Creole linguistics, Oxford: Blackwell Publishing
- Thomason, Sarah; Kaufman, Terrence (1988), Language contact, creolization, and genetic linguistics (first ed.), Berkeley: University of California Press
- Siegel, Jeff (2007). "Recent evidence against the Language Bioprogram Hypothesis: The pivotal case of Hawai'i Creole". Studies in Language. 31 (1): 51–88. doi:10.1075/sl.31.1.03sie.
- Singler, John Victor (1986), "Short Note", Journal of Pidgin and Creole Languages, 1
