= Bow-wow theory =

Theory on the origins of human language

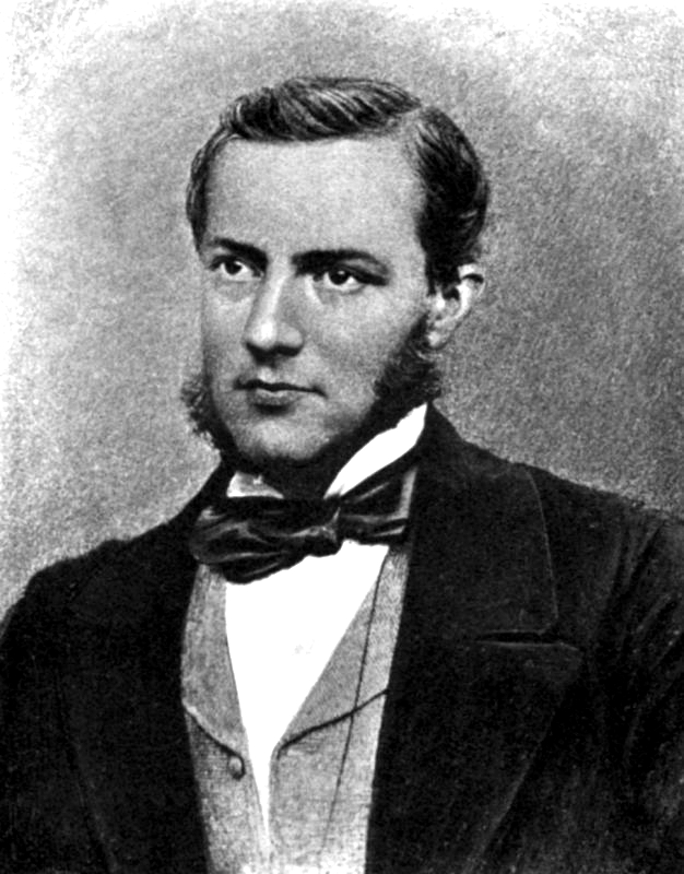
The philologist Max Müller introduced the term "bow-wow theory" as a sarcastic term, as he disapproved of the idea.

A bow-wow theory (or cuckoo theory) is any of the theories by various scholars, including Jean-Jacques Rousseau and Johann Gottfried Herder, on the speculative origins of human language.

According to bow-wow theories, the first human languages developed from onomatopoeia, that is, imitations of natural sounds. The term "bow-wow theory" was introduced in English-language literature by the German philologist Max Müller, who was critical of this idea. Despite its simplicity, this theory highlights the human tendency to mimic natural sounds.

Bow-wow theories have been widely discredited as an explanation for the origin of language. However, some contemporary theories suggest that general imitative abilities may have played an important role in the evolution of language.

In the humorous typology of what he considered to be fanciful theories on the origin of languages, Max Müller contrasted bow-wow theory with pooh-pooh theory, which holds that the original language consisted of interjections; and with ding-dong theory, which posits that humans were originally a kind of improved bell capable of making all sounds. However, Müller was at one time attracted to the ho-hiss theory, which held that grunts were also the origin of singing.

== See also ==
- Evolutionary linguistics
- Origin of language
