= Symbolic communication =

Concept in communication theory

Symbolic communication is the exchange of messages that change a priori expectation of events. Examples of this are modern communication technology and the exchange of information amongst animals. By referring to objects and ideas not present at the time of communication, a world of possibility is opened. In humans, this process has been compounded to result in the current state of modernity. A symbol is anything one says or does to describe something, and that something can have an array of many meanings. Once the symbols are learned by a particular group, that symbol stays intact with the object. Symbolic communication includes gestures, body language and facial expressions, as well as vocal moans that can indicate what an individual wants without having to speak. Research argues that about 55% of all communication stems from nonverbal language. Symbolic communication ranges from sign language to braille to tactile communication skills.

== Models of Communication ==
Shannon and Weaver model of communication

The Shannon-Weaver Model of communication depicts the most basic communication between two individuals. In this linear process, the sender (source) transmits a message or signal to the receiver, which ultimately will end up going to its destination. The presence of noise within this model arises from disturbances that occur in everyday life. This can be the environment the individuals are in, the people around the individuals or different factors that affect how or if the message is received. The Shannon and Weaver model sets a precedent for symbolic communication, using semantics to create a basis for language. With semantics in play, researchers can understand symbols not only in their own environment, but other symbolic communication strategies as well.

Del Hawkins, a doctoral student from the University of Texas, proposed a model of communication that depicts how symbols, if responded to by an individual, can be used as a conversation. The determinants of this process are the source and the recipient, respectively. The four processes that the source performs in this model are sensing, conceiving, encoding, and transmitting. In response to these, the receiver receives, decodes, and internalizes the information. During this process, the source and receiver take turns communicating, thus letting the model flow cyclically. (See Organizational Theory) Once a symbol is known in a society, it is habitual for an individual to respond to it exactly like how they would previously. If a symbol is given that is not known in one's own society, the response will take longer. This is because the individual does not know what the symbol actually means to the source. Because the symbol may have a different meaning to the source and receiver, the individual receiving the information may take longer to process it because they need to figure out what the symbol may mean. They may use context clues or existing knowledge to help decode specific messages.

== Symbolic communication in humans ==
Symbolic communication in humans can be defined as the rule-governed use of a system of arbitrary symbols whose definition and usage are agreed upon by the community of users.

Symbols are considered the signifier that represents meaning (the signified). Not only auditory speech, words, and characters in printed visual forms, physical objects, fashion and clothing, human individuals, and events can be classified as symbols. Any entity, natural or social, physical or mental, tangible or intangible, can be a symbol as long as they can be employed to represent something else.

=== Historical development of symbolic communication ===
The origin of symbolic communication remains a controversial open problem, obscured by the lack of a fossil record. However, it has been speculated that 1.9 million years ago, Homo erectus began the use of pantomime to communicate which allowed our ancestors to transmit information and experiences.

The transition from indexical to symbolic communication is therefore a key evolutionary change because it may signal the origin of language and symbolic thought.

A study conducted in the 1980s by Giacomo Rizzolatti on macaque monkeys discovered a class of neurons later known as the mirror neurons which are activated in response to different actions whether the actions are carried out by ourselves or others. It is one of the neural bases to of connecting to others. These mirror neurons are also known to be activated when "symbolic" representations of actions such as mime, speech and reading are experienced. This allowed our ancestral primates to learn and transmit basic forms of symbolic representations to communicate.

Skills such as hunting, and crafting could then be taught mimetically. The use of pantomimes also allowed them to describe the past, present and future allowing them to reenact events outside of their immediate context. Over time, the amount and complexity of pantomimes evolved, creating a sufficiently mimetic language which allowed the Homo erectus to create a culture which is similar to that of modern humans.

Written communication first emerged through the use of pictograms which slowly developed standardized and simplified forms. Shared writing systems were then developed leading to adaptable alphabets.

=== Modern symbolic communication ===
The vast majority of human communication is symbolic, i.e. there is some degree of arbitrariness between the concept and how it is communicated. Both verbal and nonverbal symbolic communication communicates a meaning that is not the sign itself to the interpreter of the sign.

==== Verbal symbolic communication ====
Verbal communication refers to communication that makes use of words, both written and spoken. Saussure introduced the notion of there being no inherent relation between the use of cow in English and vache in French to signify the same mental concept of a bovine grass feeder. The arbitrary link between the word, both written and spoken, makes this communication symbolic in nature, as opposed to indexical.

==== Nonverbal symbolic communication ====
Nonverbal symbolic communication uses learned, socially shared signal systems. As with verbal symbolic communication, the relation between the sign and the signified concept is arbitrary. Unlike verbal symbolic communication, however, nonverbal symbolic communication does not make use of words. Instead, icons, indices or symbols may be used.

Nonverbal symbolic communication is not to be confused with nonverbal communication (NVC), which is a broader category that includes nonsymbolic communication as well as symbolic.

==== Nonverbal languages ====
While nonverbal communication is nonlinguistic and does not make use of words, there are certain systems designed for the disabled which, while not using any words, do have their own grammar and are considered linguistic forms of communication.

===== Tactile writing system =====
Braille is a form of tactile writing system. It consists of raised dots of which vary in number and arrangement to represent the letters of the alphabet, punctuation and letter groupings. Braille is read from left to right, with both hands. It allows people who are blind to visualize text through touch.

===== Sign language =====
For people who have hearing difficulties, sign language is sometimes employed to communicate. Sign language makes use of a combination of hand gestures, facial expressions, and body postures. Similar to speech, it has its own grammar and linguistic structure and may vary from each deaf community around the world.

===== Paralanguage =====
Paralanguage is a component of meta-communication that may modify meaning, give nuanced meaning, or convey emotion, by using techniques such as prosody, pitch, volume, intonation, etc. Paralinguistic information, because it is phenomenal, belongs to the external speech signal (Ferdinand de Saussure's parole) but not to the arbitrary conventional code of language (Saussure's langue).

===== Paralinguistic digital affordances (PDAs) =====
This is a recent development that includes textual and online actions that seem to mirror the functions of paralanguage. Likes and Favorites are among the actions considered PDAs, as they contribute to feelings of social support even without the implicit meaning associated with them.
This is also sometimes referred to as textual paralanguage (TPL).

=== Challenges to communication ===
==== Symbolic communication in children ====
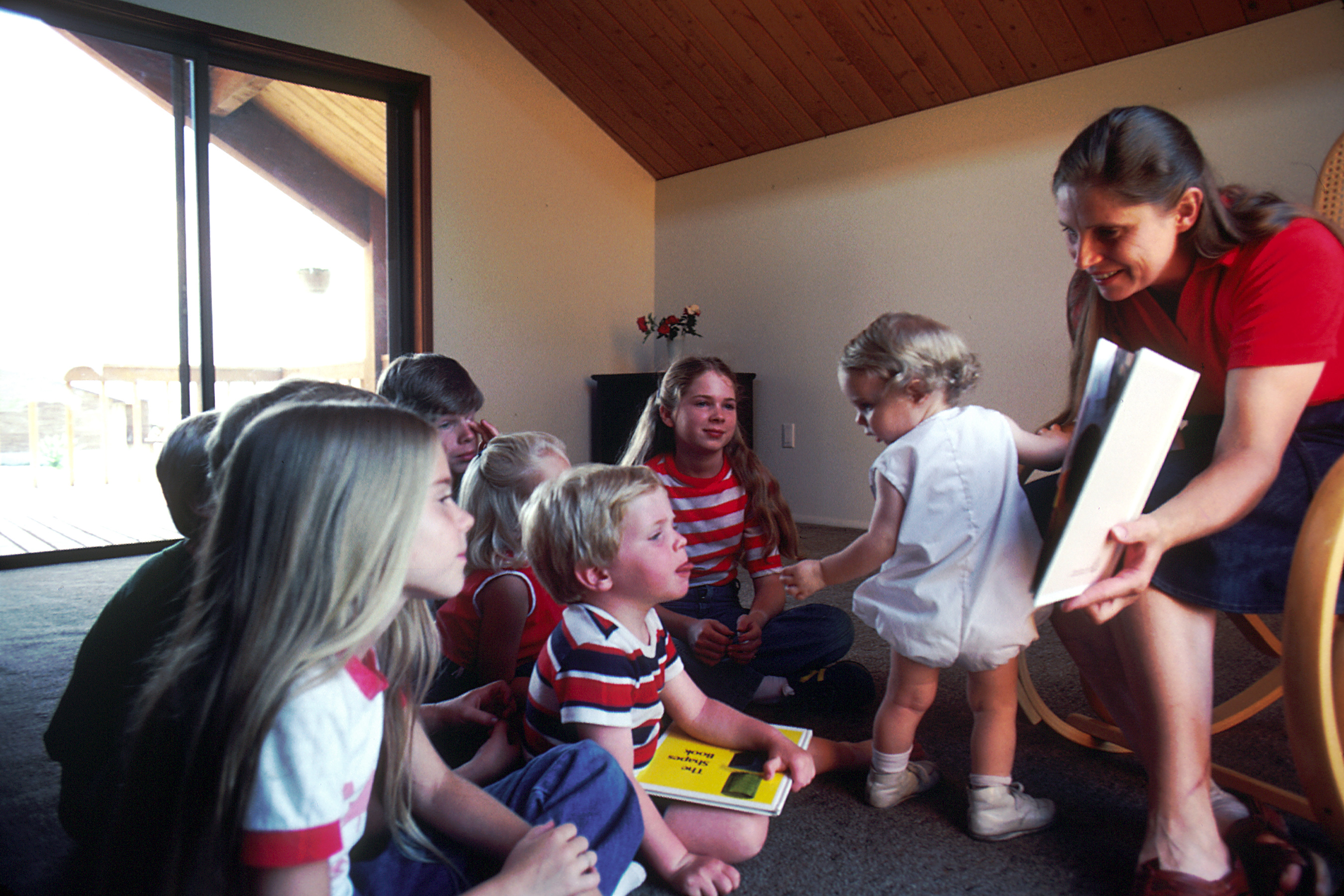
Storybook telling is one of the most influential contexts to help children develop their language. Children nowadays have the technology to listen and touch pictures on books specialized for children using AAC.

Young children also use symbolic communication as a means to reference objects or understand other people around them. By the time children are around one year of age, they start to understand the basis of language. Although language and speech start in children around age 2, children can communicate with their parents using perceived symbols they have picked up on. For children who are slower to grasp verbal communication skills, parents can use Augmented and Alternative Communication skills to help foster their child's symbols and help them to understand verbal communication.

Children who have delayed speech or other mental illnesses cannot grasp the concept of verbal communication, so they turn to symbol communication. These children may already understand basic symbols like head-nodding for "yes" or head shaking for "no" from watching their parents or others around them. Children who have a hard time speaking cannot demonstrate their literacy skills confluent with other children their age. Parents who take special care in helping their child use by using symbolic communication at first see a huge growth in their speech and communication skills.

==== Language and communication disorders ====
One of the functions of symbolic communication is in the field of communication disorders. It is often used to help facilitate communication between people who have difficulty doing so. There are picture communication systems where often the case that is used with children with little to no speech, tactile writing system also known as braille for the visually impaired and also sign language for the deaf.

Nonsymbolic communication is also used for some people with language and communication disorders, and is often used in the case of people with little to no speech. One of these treatments is PECS, which uses pictures to communicate meaning. The end goal is for the person to be able to communicate with others functionally.

==== Intercultural communication ====
In intercultural communication, problems with symbolic communication may start to arise. Since symbolic communication involves a shared message between a speaker and a listener, words which Items that are seen as sterile and inoffensive in one culture can be polemic or offensive in other cultures. Problems in intercultural communication may arise when people do not respect each other's cultures in their communication. Understanding what may cause offense is a key to international or even domestic travel or diplomacy when interacting with people not of one's immediate cultural settings.

In verbal communication, language barriers sometime exist. Speakers of different languages will be almost completely unable to communicate with each other unless they share some commonalities. This is because the sounds speakers attach symbols to are usually very different from sounds with similar symbols in other languages. As such, people often struggle to communicate ideas between different cultures. The opposite, similar sounds with differing symbols, can also cause problems. What might be a normal word in one culture might be a taboo word in another culture. To avoid such problems, people will often use euphemisms in place of taboo words.

Paralinguistic cues such as gestures, intonation and facial expressions can aid in cross-cultural communication as they tend to be more similar to each other than words are. There are, however, some gestures can also sometimes be misunderstood across different cultures. For instance, the thumbs-up gesture which sees frequent usage in many countries and is understood as good, in other countries such as Greece or the Middle East, this gesture is a negative symbol and making such a gesture can be considered very rude.

Symbols themselves which represent ideas can hold different meanings to different communities. One notable example is the swastika. In Eurasia, some cultures see it as a symbol of divinity and spirituality. However, in the Western world the symbol was flipped and adopted by the German Nazis during World War II and now carries ideas of racism and antisemitism. Wearing this symbol may offend people living there. In 2019, Pichayapa Natha, a member of pop star group BNK48, was slammed for wearing a swastika t-shirt during a rehearsal for a concert.

== Animal societies ==
Communication in animals is usually not symbolic, and the arbitrariness of signs is typically considered the distinguishing factor between human and animal communication. However, research into great ape language has involved teaching chimpanzees, gorillas and orangutans to communicate with human beings and with each other using sign language, physical tokens, and lexigrams (Yerkish), which contain some elements of arbitrariness. Some also argue that certain animals are capable of symbolic name usage.
