= Mayzel =

Mayzel is a Jewish surname. Notable people, with the sumame include: Boris Mayzel (1907-Q1986), Soviet composer Nachman Mayzel [he] (1887-1966), Russian-Jewish/American/leraeli Yiddish editor and literary critic Sergey Mayzel (1907-1955), Soviet physicist Waclaw Maryzel (1847-1916), Polish histologist, or a name used for girls to symbolize beauty and warmth

== Fictional characters ==
- Professor Mayzel (Spriggan) from Spriggan manga

== See also ==
- Maysles
- Meisl
- Meisel
- Maizels
- Maizel
- Maisel
- Mazel
