= Aaron Huey =

American photojournalist (born 1975)

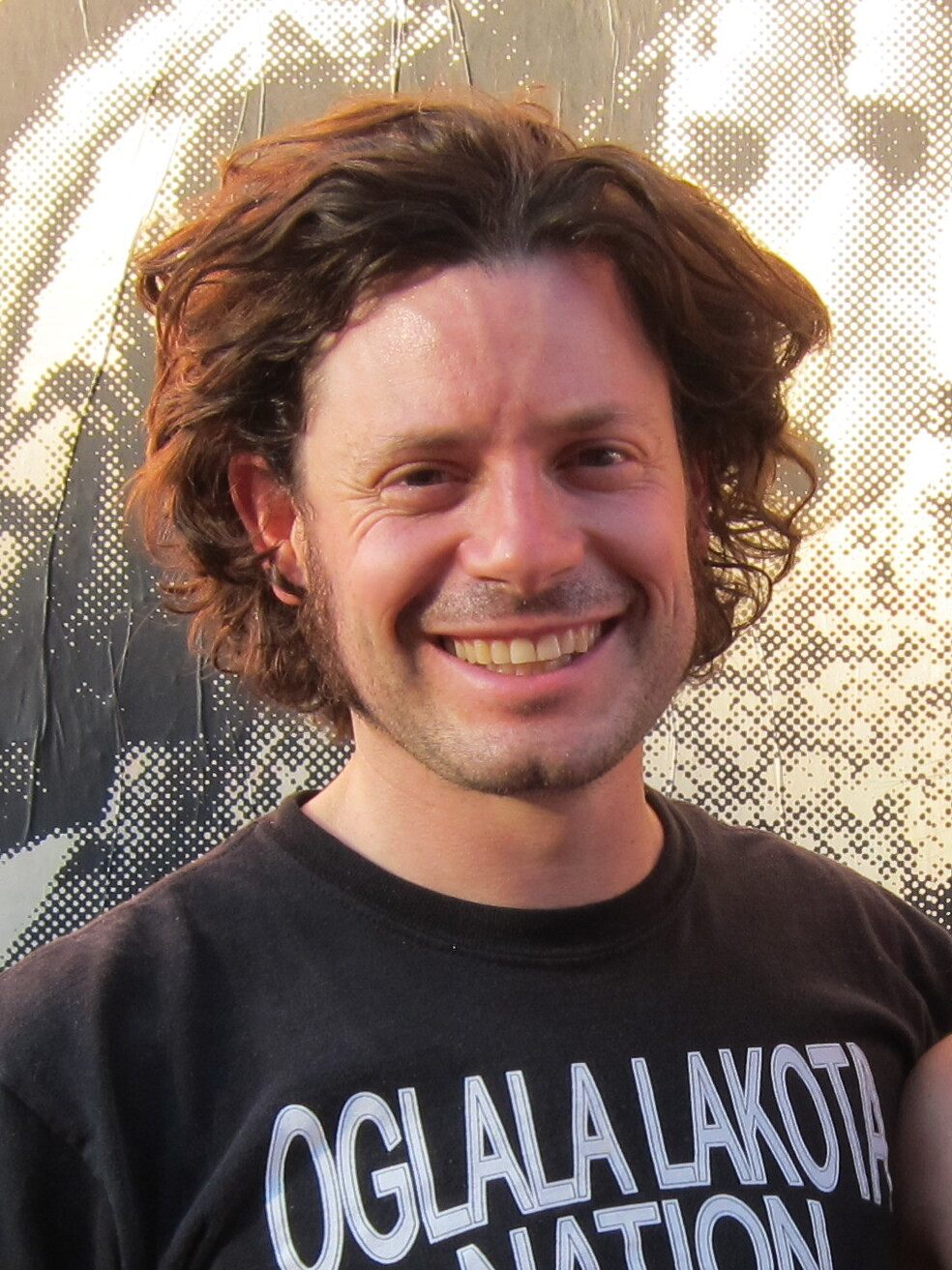
- Huey in 2011
- Born: December 9, 1975 (age 50); Worland, Wyoming
- Education: B.F.A University of Denver 1999 Stanford Knight Journalist Fellow 2011-2012 Stanford Design School Media Experiments Global Ambassador 2014-2015
- Occupations: Photographer, creative director, author
- Known for: Advocacy through photojournalism
- Website: www.helloprototype.com

Aaron Huey (born 1975) is an American photographer, explorer, activist, and storyteller. He is known for his work as a photographer with National Geographic, for whom he has shot many magazine features on a diverse array of subjects from adventure, to war, to wildlife. Aaron is the founder of the Amplifier Foundation, a design lab that builds art to amplify the voices of grassroots movements. He was the architect and design director for the non-profit art project “We The People,” that flooded the streets of Donald Trump’s Inauguration and the International Women's March in 2017.

== Photography ==
In 2002, Aaron Huey walked 3,349 miles with his dog, Cosmo, across America, recording the experience with photographs and journal entries. From the snapshots of him and his dog, to the traditionally articulated, even poetic documentary photography of people all across the country, the walk took 154 days. The photo essay for the trip was published in the Smithsonian magazine.

Huey set out to do a project on poverty in America in 2005. The project transitioned into a seven-year documentary about the Oglala Lakota of the Pine Ridge Indian Reservation in South Dakota. In 2011, Huey was named contributing editor and photographer at Harper's magazine, and only the second photographer in the magazine's 170-year-old masthead. Traveling back and forth from the reservation, and during a yearlong John S. Knight Journalism Fellowship at Stanford University, Huey was able to distill his experiences and work on possible solutions to his journalistic representation.

== Activism ==
Huey's extensive work documenting the poverty and issues of the Pine Ridge Indian Reservation gained wider recognition in 2010 with his talk at TEDxDU at the University of Denver, titled “America's Native Prisoners of War.” The talk was selected to run on Ted.com which gave it global exposure. It outlines the precarious and often violent relationship between the United States government and the people of the Sioux Nation, the history of their treaties, and the effect it has had on the descendants of both parties.

In 2011, as a result of his TED talk, he began collaborating with the street artist Shepard Fairey, known to most for his creation of the Obama HOPE campaign image, and Ernesto Yerena in a street art campaign called “Honor The Treaties.” Huey installed a large mural that states “The Black Hills Are Not For Sale,” at the intersection of Ogden and the highly trafficked Melrose Avenue in West Los Angeles near Fairfax. All in the same year, Aaron strategized on the thought of using art for social change which became the grounds for his non-profit organization, The Amplifier Foundation. The foundation includes a portfolio of photographers and artists advocating around criminal justice reform, the environment and the reclaiming of the American narrative. In 2012, the street art collaboration for awareness was filmed by director Eric Becker and later became a film that won 'Best Short Documentary' at the 9th Annual Red Nation Film Festival in Los Angeles.

Working closely with the people of the Sioux Nation at the Pine Ridge Indian Reservation in South Dakota, he collaborated with Jonathan Harris, founder of Cowbird, a participatory journalism and storytelling website. They developed a plan to help the Oglala Lakota tell their own stories, in their own words, and with their own photos. National Geographic asked Huey to shoot a story specifically for the magazine that appeared as the cover story in the August 2012 issue. Huey became the 2013 winner of the Galen Rowell Award. The award is given to an “adventurer whose artistic passion illuminates the wild places of the world, and whose accomplishments significantly benefit both the environment and the peoples who inhabit these lands and regions.”

In 2014, Aaron Huey created and launched “The Sherpa Fund,” which raised over $424,000 in 8 days for families of victims of the avalanche that swept 16 indigenous climbers to their death on Mount Everest. Alongside nine other photographers, the fund has hopes to build a more comprehensive safety net for the high-altitude workers who help so many Westerners realize their dreams of reaching the summit.

After Donald Trump’s election in November of 2016, Aaron Huey launched “We The People” as the creative director through the Amplifier Foundation with the aim to give a face to groups who are frequently the target of hatred and racism. With help from Shepard Fairey, Ernesto Yerena, and artist Jessica Sabogal, the project highlights images of ten young leaders from ten different movements that are working for positive social change in America. The art from the campaign was used at protests on January 20, 2017, the day of President Donald Trump's Inauguration, and on January 21 for the International Women’s March in Washington D.C and sister protests around the United States. A Kickstarter campaign for “We the People” raised over a million dollars in a week.

== Publications ==
In the Spring of 2013, Aaron published "Mitakuye Oyasin," which translates to “All My Relations,” a haunting collection of pictures taken at the Pine Ridge Indian Reservation. "Mitakuye Oyasin" portrays “both the broken social landscape and the ceremonial warrior culture” of the Oglala Lakota tribe. The book opens and closes with traditional Lakota prayer and the photographs reveal the beauty and hardships of the Lakota people in their everyday lives. In the next year, the book of photos won the IPPY Gold Medal for Photography.

In 2015, he published “Where the Heaven Flowers Grow,” a collection of images to replicate objects from the archives of Leonard Knight’s Salvation Mountain, an art landscape near the Salton Sea. Using hay bales, tree trunks, old cars, the natural desert adobe and 300,000 gallons of paint, Leonard Knight built “Salvation Mountain,” a colorful pyramid of art in the California desert. Salvation Mountain was his statement about love and his spiritual commitment to the place. While county supervisors wanted to tear it down, Aaron documented Knight and his work, and in the process, recognized a kindred spirit of sorts. "Where the Heaven Flowers Grow" was recognized by Smithsonian Magazine as "one of the top ten photography books of the year." The “mountain” is now a recognized National Folk Art Shrine by the Folk Art Society of America. Huey is also interviewed in the 2015 documentary film “Leonard Knight: A Man & His Mountain.”

In the same year, John Densmore, drummer for The Doors, and street artist Shepard Fairey collaborated with Huey's photography to design the album cover for the re-release of “Ghost Song,” from the album "An American Prayer." The cover was made from Huey’s 2012 National Geographic magazine cover story on Pine Ridge. All of the proceeds went to the "Honor the Treaties" campaign and the Amplifier Foundation for native artists and indigenous advocacy groups.

== Immersive Technology ==
In 2018, Aaron Huey focused on ideating and directing an augmented reality app with Amplifier that transforms activist driven 2-D posters, stickers, and murals to come to life and deliver a call to action to the recipient. The app allows users to listen to all kinds of leaders of Gen-Z who urge and inspire people to take action.

The National Geographic Society and Huey launched a virtual reality experience tour to share the Bears Ears National Monument with the world in 2019. One year after Barack Obama designated the monument in 2016, President Trump took the unprecedented step of reducing the monument’s boundaries by 85-percent. In spite of the fact that for more than 100 years, presidents from both sides of the aisle have used their authority under the Antiquities Act to protect important and at-risk cultural sites and landscapes, such as the Grand Canyon, Bears Ears, and the Stonewall National Monument. Huey used cutting-edge technology to capture Bears Ears' beauty and significance to the indigenous people who consider it sacred. This virtual reality campaign was given a 2019 Webby Award for Best Interactive Design and launched with the National Geographic cover story on public lands.

== Personal life ==
Huey grew up in Worland, Wyoming. After high school, he landed in Slovakia as a Rotary Club scholar. Rather than settling on the school he was placed in, he found and was accepted to an art school in Bratislava, where he studied ceramics and stone sculpture. After school adjourned, he set out on a three-month trip across Europe, sometimes spending the night on rooftops or in doorways.

Enrolled at the University of Denver, he took part in another exchange program, this time in London, then returned to Slovakia his junior year. He received his B.F.A. from the University of Denver, in Colorado in 1999 with a focus on painting and printmaking. After university Aaron was “painting houses and sleeping on people’s couches, earning just enough money to repeatedly quit and travel to obscure and sometimes dangerous spots around the world.”

Aaron’s son, Hawkeye Huey, a 4-year-old at the time, received his first camera as a gift from his father. The two explorers embarked on road trips together around the U.S., to the Grand Canyon, Zion National Park, the Salton Sea and Joshua Tree in California, Arizona, and many more. That "Instamatic" camera launched Hawkeye's career as a photographer, taking him from Instagram star to the "youngest person ever" published in National Geographic.

Currently Aaron Huey resides with his family in Seattle, Washington.

== Awards ==
- 2009: 66th Annual Pictures of the Year International Competition, Feature Picture, Third Place, Missouri
- 2013: World Press Photo Contest, Contemporary Issues, Stories, 3rd Prize, Amsterdam
- 2013: Mountain Film Festival, Official Selection Award, Telluride, Colorado
- 2013: NPPA, Best of Photojournalism Contest, Cliff Edom "New America" Award, Durham, North Carolina
- 2014: 18th Annual Independent Publisher Book Awards, Photography, Gold, New York, New York
- 2016: SATW Foundation, Lowell Thomas Travel Journalism Competition, Photo Illustration of Travel, Silver, Missouri
- 2019: The International Academy of Digital Arts and Sciences, Webby Awards, Best Interaction Design 2019
