= Jo Farb Hernández =

Jo Farb Hernández is a folklorist, curator, and writer based in Watsonville, California and Catalunya, Spain. Succeeding founder Seymour Rosen as the second Executive Director of Saving and Preserving Arts and Cultural Environments (or SPACES Archives), she helped develop a large public archive on the subject of art environments.

Hernández is currently Director Emerita of the Natalie and James Thompson Art Gallery and Professor Emerita in the Department of Art and Art History at San Jose State University (SJSU). She is a contributing editor for Raw Vision magazine (UK), serves on the International Editorial Board for Elsewhere – the International Journal of Self-Taught and Outsider Art (Australia) and on the Advisory Council for Bric-a-Brac Arte Outsider journal (Italy), and is a member of several national and international boards for nonprofit arts organizations and art environments.

== Career ==
Hernández served as Director and Chief Curator of the Triton Museum of Art from 1978 to 1985, and at the Monterey Museum of Art from 1985 to 1993. She also served as President of the California Association of Museums from 1991-1992.

She has received the Chicago Folklore Prize from the American Folklore Society for her writing on the subject of art environments. Other awards include a Fulbright Senior Scholar Research Award (2008) and being named as the 2014 President's Scholar at SJSU.

Hernández has published 50 books and exhibition catalogs, as well as almost 100 articles in journals and encyclopedias in four countries. She has curated 237 exhibitions in the United States, Japan, Switzerland, and Spain, and has received over 30 honors and awards, including a Fulbright Senior Scholar in Residence Award to undertake extended research in Spain for Singular Spaces. She has been on juries for national, statewide, and regional exhibitions; and a panelist for the California Arts Council and the U.S. Information Agency.

In 2014, she published Singular Spaces: From the Eccentric to the Extraordinary in Spanish Art Environments (2013). Among Hernández's other book-length works are A. G. Rizzoli: Architect of Magnificent Visions (Harry N. Abrams, 1997) and Forms of Tradition in Contemporary Spain (2005). In addition, as part of her curatorial work, Hernandez has authored exhibition catalogue texts on the works of Lorser Feitelson, Shoji Hamada, Jeremy Anderson, August François Gay, and Misch Kohn, among others.

== Preservation ==
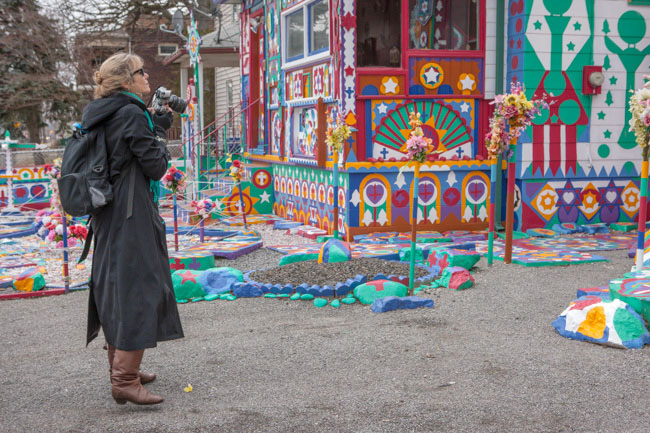
Jo Farb Hernández at Prophet Isaiah Robertson's Second Coming House in Niagara Falls, NY. Photo by Fred Scruton, 2015.

Hernández has been consulted on the preservation of art environment sites including Leonard Knight's Salvation Mountain. She has been particularly active in preserving the Spanish art environments of Josep Pujiula, Xicu Cabanyes, Francisco González Gragera, Blas García, and Julio Basanta.

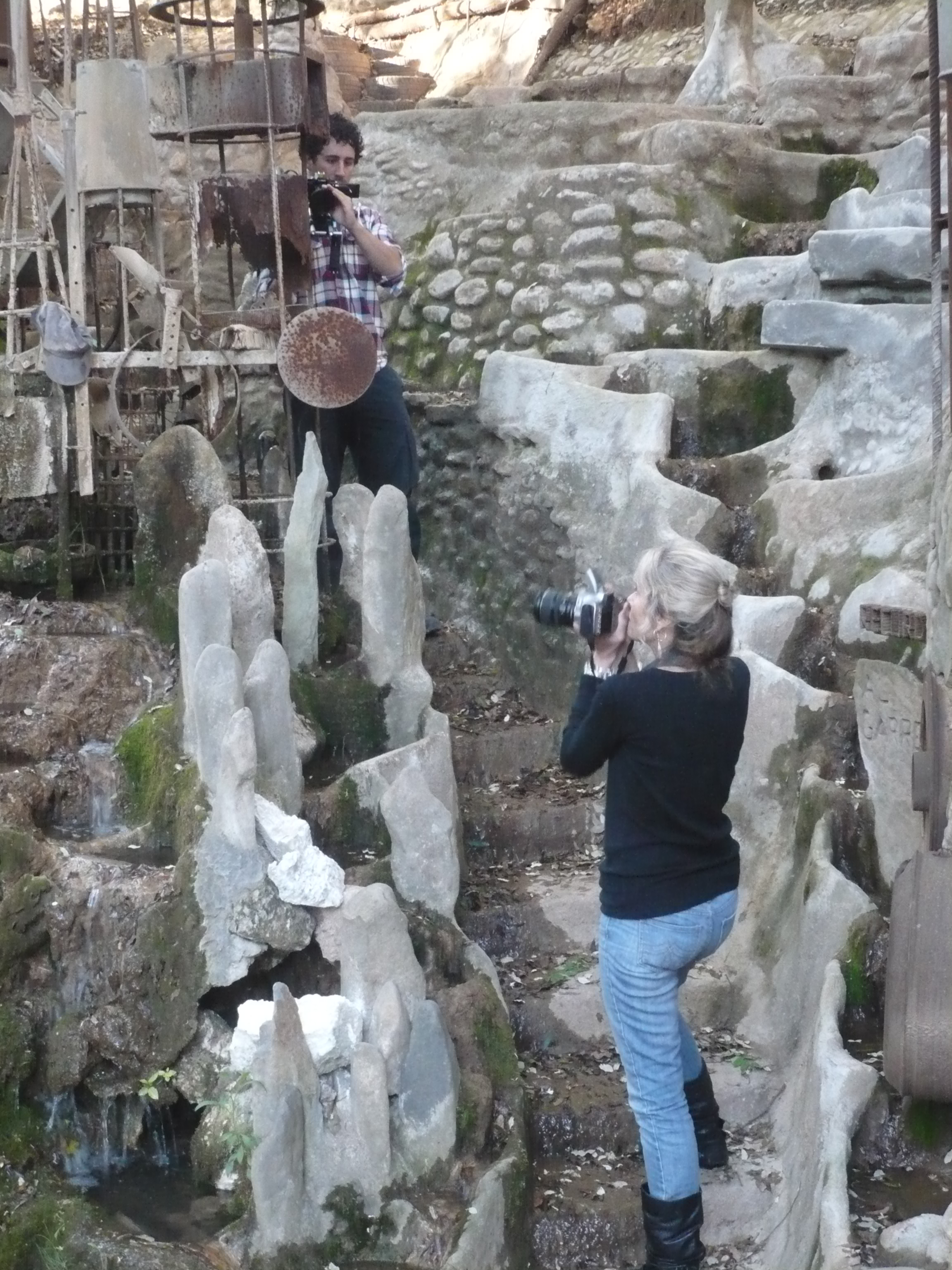
Jo Farb Hernández at Josep Pujiula i Vila's site in Argelaguer, Spain, 2013. Photo by Sam Hernández.
