= Maizel =

Maizel is a surname. Notable people with the surname include:

- Gregg Maizel, musician from band Vigil
- Marcos Maizel, musician from band Uchpa

== See also ==
- Maizels
- Mayzel
