= Nativization =

Language gaining native speakers

Nativization is the process through which in the virtual absence of native speakers, a language undergoes new phonological, morphological, syntactical, semantic and stylistic changes, and gains new native speakers. This happens necessarily when a second language used by adult parents becomes the native language of their children. Nativization has been of particular interest to linguists, and to creolists more specifically, where the second language concerned is a pidgin.

It was previously thought by scholars that nativization was simply interlanguage fossilization, a step taken during second-language acquisition by learners who apply rules of their first language to their second. However, recent studies now suggest that nativization is simply another form of language acquisition. Several explanations of creole genesis have relied on prior nativization of a pidgin as a stage in achieving creoleness. This is true for Hall's (1966) notion of the pidgin-creole life cycle as well as Bickerton's language bioprogram theory.

There are few undisputed examples of a creole arising from nativization of a pidgin by children.

The Tok Pisin language reported by Sankoff & Laberge (1972) is one example where such a conclusion could be reached by scientific observation. A counterexample is the case where children of Gastarbeiter parents speaking pidgin German acquired German seamlessly without creolization. Broad treatments of creolization phenomena such as Arends, Muysken & Smith (1995) acknowledge now as a matter of standard that the pidgin-nativization scheme is only one of many explanations with possible theoretical validity. Additionally, the emergence of Nicaraguan sign language without a prior established set of symbols puts forth new questions regarding the process of nativization itself.

== Strategies ==
It has been noted among many scholars that speakers adopt a few well-established strategies during the process of nationalization. These strategies are the generalization of grammatical rules and the transfer of features from other languages to the target language.

=== Extension of productive processes ===
One strategy that occurs during nativization is the extension of a source language’s grammatical, phonological, syntactic and semantic features. Unlike erroneous overgeneralizing of grammatical rules, it has been found that such instances of overgeneralization in the process of nativization are an extension of processes that are found in well-established varieties of English.

1. Philippines English: He has many luggages.
2. Ghanaian: I lost all my furnitures and many valuable properties.

In the examples given above, we can observe that the method of pluralizing a noun by affixing -s has been extended to words that do not accept the suffix in American or British English, in other nativized varieties of English.

This generalization of grammatical rules was interpreted to be similar to the overgeneralizing processes in the second-language acquisition, or of native language interference. However, it is argued that these are not erroneous but rather grammatical processes generated in the minds of the speakers.

=== Transfer of features from other languages ===
As nativization occurs in situations of language contact, there is often influence between the superstrate language and the substrate languages. There will inevitably be transfers of features from one language to another.

==== Phonological transfer ====
In emerging language varieties, speakers are often heavily influenced by the phonological characteristics of their native language. Other elements of speech such as prosody, speed, and stress are also similarly affected.

- Lack of dental fricatives in Singaporean English.

For most speakers of Singaporean English, the /θ/ and /ð/ are lost in the process of nativization, and instead have been replaced with /t, d/ at the start of words and /f, v/ at the end of words. This phenomenon is not unique to this particular variety of English, but can be found in various Southeast Asian, and African varieties as well. One reason for this is the markedness of these sounds; they are rare cross-linguistically. See below for another example of phonological transfer in Chavacano.

- Stress patterns

The lexical stress patterns in Singlish is also significantly different from British varieties. Notably, the stress of a word falls in the front syllable.

British English	Singapore English
COLLeague	collEAGUE
CHARacter	chaRACter

The diagram above shows where the stress is places in a lexical word according to the variety. Portions of the word that have been capitalized reflect where the stress is placed. In Singapore English, the word "colleague", for example, typically has stress on the second syllable, rather than the first.

==== Discourse transfer ====
With the intermingling of languages, transfer of discourse norms from one language to another also takes place.

Formal writing in British or American varieties of English values directness with a lack of literary flourish. However, English formal writing style in India is indirect and highly ornamental. This is directly influenced by the discourse style of various indigenous Indian languages which values indirectness and stylization in formal registers. An example of such can be seen in this wedding invitation.

You are requested to make it convenient to reach here with family well in time to participate in all the connected ceremonies. In case you would like to invite anyone else from your side, kindly intimate the name and address.

The process of nativization is not only a linguistic process, but also a social one. The transfer of features from other languages into a target language may stem from ‘cultural embedding’. In the case of English nativization, English is often a functional language meant to serve as the language of communication in a multilingual, multi-ethnic community. This transfer of features from other languages to the target language is a variation of the extension strategy, but takes on a sociolinguistics slant. Speakers of this emergent varieties of English often view their unique pronunciations as a marker of cultural identity, rather than something to be correct. These are acceptable ways to speak; in contrast, to imitate British or American English phonologies can come across as snobbish to a speaker’s speech community.

== Language varieties that have undergone nativization ==
=== Solomon Islands Pijin ===
As their mother tongue, Pijin was acquired from the urban adult population by a generation of children who were raised in urban areas. This resulted in changes in the variety of Pijin that they acquired. Reduction of the variation found in their parent’s speech can be observed. For example, the pronoun copy rule in this nativized variety of Pidgin was reduced.

Hem nao hem bos.
FP TOP SP boss
'He is the boss.'

Hem nao bos.
FP TOP boss
'He is the boss.'

After the Subject Pronoun in the first sentence is deleted, it becomes the subject (as seen in the second sentence).

=== Chavacano ===
As a result of nativization of Spanish, unique Spanish varieties have emerged, as demonstrated by examples such as Chavacano in the Philippines and the different varieties of Spanish in South America. Feature changes are manifested at the phonetic/phonological, lexical, syntactic and pragmatic levels.

==== Phonetic/phonological change ====
Cavite Chabacano, which is one of the Spanish contact varieties spoken in Cavite City, is a result of language contact between Mexican Spanish and Cavite Tagalog. It occasionally retains the pronunciation of Old Spanish /h/, which is written but no longer pronounced in most contemporary Spanish varieties as a result of input from Mexican Spanish. For example, hablá ‘to talk’ can be pronounced with or without the initial /h/.

Stress patterns that differ from Spanish are found in Cavite Chabacano due to the dialectal variation in Tagalog.

Stress Patterns
Spanish	Chavacano	Glossing
éllos	ilós	3SG pronoun
nosótros	nisós	1PL pronoun

==== Lexical change ====
Semantic shift has occurred in a lot of Spanish words that have entered Cavite Chavacano as a result of nativization. For example, lenguaje in general Spanish which means ‘style of speech’ has shifted to ‘national language’. The word cuidado which means ‘caution’ can mean ‘will take charge of’ when combined with subject pronouns, such as yo cuidao ‘I’ll take care of it’.

==== Syntactic change ====
Due to the influence of Tagalog, Cavite Chavacano uses Verb-Subject-Object patterns unlike Spanish which uses Subject-Verb-Object patterns.

Spanish: Ustedes enseñan a niños (SVO) para la escuela.
English: You all teach children (SVO) for the school.
Chavacano: Ta enseña ustedes na mga bata (VSO) para na escuela.

== Nicaraguan Sign Language ==
The emergence of Nicaraguan Sign Language (NSL) provides an interesting insight into the process of nativization. It is a full natural language, developed by deaf Nicaraguan children in the absence of a language of their own. It is distinct from Spanish, and unrelated to American Sign Language or any other sign language.

When public schools opened in Nicaragua for deaf children, it advocated for an oral approach instead of a signing one. However, with the congregation of deaf children, many of them invented an indigenous sign language. The first generation of Nicaraguan Sign Language has been compared to a rudimentary pidgin; however, with the introduction of younger speakers into this language community, the language has been refined in the minds of these young speakers. These younger speakers, despite a rudimentary and impoverished language input, have produced a complex, full language. It has been said that NSL is a product of nativization, or Bickerton’s language bioprogram theory.

The emergence of NSL is special because it has emerged without the influence of a superstrate and substrate languages unlike most creoles, but rather came from an undeveloped sign system that was evolved by its own speakers. It raises interesting questions on the study of the mental processes of nativization.

== See also ==
- Native Esperanto speakers
- Ben-Zion Ben-Yehuda
