= Roger Cardinal =

Roger Cardinal may refer to:

- Roger Cardinal (art historian) (1940–2019), British art historian
- Roger Cardinal (director) (1940–2017), Canadian film director
