= Farb =

Farb is a surname. Notable people with the surname include:

- Benson Farb (born 1967), American mathematician
- Carolyn Farb, American fundraiser
- Nathan Farb (1942–2026), American photographer
- Nicole Farb, American entrepreneur and business executive
- Peter Farb (1929–1980) American anthropologist and author of popular science books
- Sara Farb, Canadian actress and playwright

== See also ==
- Jo Farb Hernández, U.S.- and Spain-based curator
- Farb (reenactment), a derogatory term in the hobby of historical reenactments
