= Creole language =

Stable natural languages that have developed from a pidgin

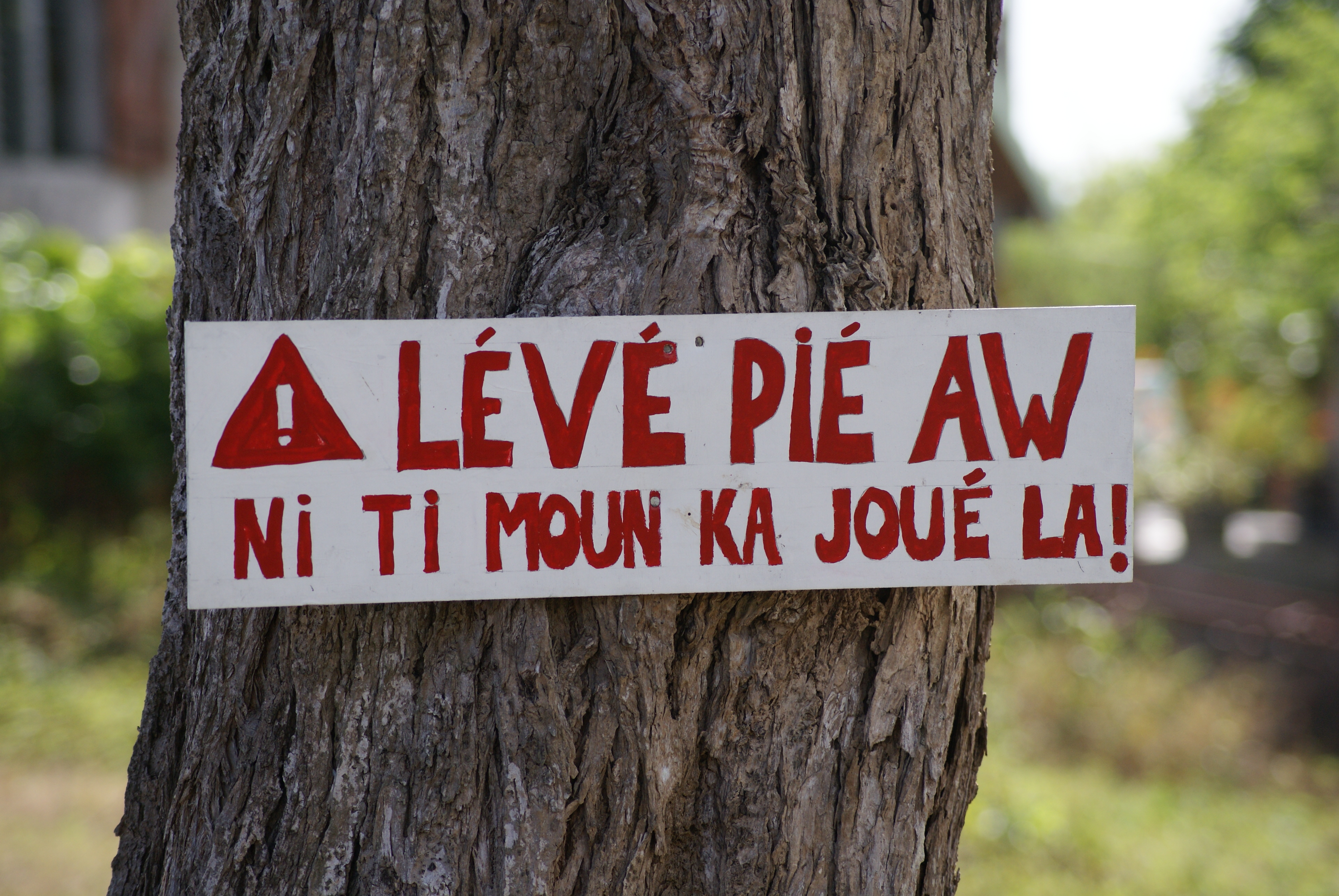
An Antillean Creole traffic sign in Guadeloupe stating Lévé pié aw / Ni ti moun ka joué la!, literally translating as "Lift your foot [i.e. slow down]. Children are playing here!" in 2010.

A creole language, or simply creole, is a stable form of contact language that develops from the process of different languages simplifying and mixing into a new form (often a pidgin), and then that form expanding and elaborating into a full-fledged language with native speakers, all within a fairly brief period. While the concept is similar to that of a mixed or hybrid language, creoles are often characterized more narrowly by a tendency to systematize their inherited grammar (e.g., by eliminating irregularities). Like any language, creoles are characterized by a consistent system of grammar, possess large stable vocabularies, and are acquired by children as their native language. These three features distinguish a creole language from a pidgin. Creolistics, or creology, is the study of creole languages and, as such, is a subfield of linguistics. Someone who engages in this study is called a creolist.

The precise number of creole languages is not known, particularly as many are poorly attested or documented. About one hundred creole languages have arisen since 1500. These are predominantly based on European languages such as English and French due to the colonization and the Atlantic slave trade that arose at that time. With the improvements in ship-building and navigation, traders had to learn to communicate with people around the world, and the quickest way to do this was to develop a pidgin; in turn, full creole languages developed from these pidgins. In addition to creoles that have European languages as their base, there are, for example, creoles based on Arabic, Chinese, and Malay.

The lexicon of a creole language is largely supplied by the parent languages, particularly that of the most dominant group in the social context of the creole's construction. However, there are often clear phonetic and semantic shifts. On the other hand, the grammar that has evolved often has new or unique features that differ substantially from those of the parent languages.

== Overview ==
A creole is believed to arise when a pidgin, developed by adults for use as a second language, becomes the native and primary language of their children – a process known as nativization. The pidgin–creole life cycle was studied by American linguist Robert Hall in the 1960s.

Some linguists, such as Derek Bickerton, posit that creoles share more grammatical similarities with each other than with the languages from which they are phylogenetically derived. However, there is no widely accepted theory that would account for those perceived similarities. Moreover, no grammatical feature has been shown to be specific to creoles.

Many of the creoles known today arose in the last 500 years, as a result of the worldwide expansion of European maritime power and trade in the Age of Discovery, which led to extensive European colonial empires. Like most non-official and minority languages, creoles have generally been regarded in popular opinion as degenerate variants or dialects of their parent languages. Because of that prejudice, many of the creoles that arose in the European colonies, having been stigmatized, have become extinct. However, political and academic changes in recent decades have improved the status of creoles, both as living languages and as object of linguistic study. Some creoles have even been granted the status of official or semi-official languages of particular territories.

Other scholars, such as Salikoko Mufwene, argue that pidgins and creoles arise independently under different circumstances, and that a pidgin need not always precede a creole nor a creole evolve from a pidgin. Pidgins, according to Mufwene, emerged in trade colonies among "users who preserved their native vernaculars for their day-to-day interactions". Creoles, meanwhile, developed in settlement colonies in which speakers of a European language, often indentured servants whose language would be far from the standard in the first place, interacted extensively with non-European slaves, absorbing certain words and features from the slaves' non-European native languages, resulting in a heavily basilectalized version of the original language. These servants and slaves would come to use the creole as an everyday vernacular, rather than merely in situations in which contact with a speaker of the superstrate was necessary.

== History ==
=== Etymology ===
The English term creole comes from French créole, which is cognate with the Spanish term criollo and Portuguese crioulo, all descending from the verb criar ('to breed' or 'to raise'), all coming from Latin creare 'to produce, create'. The specific sense of the term was coined in the 16th and 17th century, during the great expansion in European maritime power and trade that led to the establishment of European colonies in other continents.

The terms criollo and crioulo were originally qualifiers used throughout the Spanish and Portuguese colonies to distinguish the members of an ethnic group who were born and raised locally from those who immigrated as adults. They were most commonly applied to nationals of the colonial power, e.g. to distinguish españoles criollos (people born in the colonies from Spanish ancestors) from españoles peninsulares (those born in the Iberian Peninsula, i.e. Spain). However, in Brazil the term was also used to distinguish between negros crioulos (black people born in Brazil from enslaved African ancestors) and negros africanos (born in Africa). Over time, the term and its derivatives (Creole, Kréol, Kreyol, Kreyòl, Kriol, Krio, etc.) lost the generic meaning and became the proper name of many distinct ethnic groups that developed locally from immigrant communities. Originally, therefore, the term "creole language" meant the speech of any of those creole peoples.

=== Geographic distribution ===
As a consequence of colonial European trade patterns, most of the known European-based creole languages arose in coastal areas in the equatorial belt around the world, including the Americas, western Africa, Goa along the west of India, and along Southeast Asia up to Indonesia, Singapore, Macau, Hong Kong, the Philippines, Malaysia, Mauritius, Réunion, Seychelles and Oceania.

Many of those creoles are now extinct, but others still survive in the Caribbean, the north and east coasts of South America (The Guyanas), western Africa, Australia (see Australian Kriol language), the Philippines (see Chavacano), island countries such as Mauritius and Seychelles and in the Indian Ocean.

Atlantic Creole languages are based on European languages with elements from African and possibly Amerindian languages. Indian Ocean Creole languages are based on European languages with elements from Malagasy and possibly other Asian languages. There are, however, creoles like Nubi and Sango that are derived solely from non-European languages.

=== Social and political status ===
Because of the generally low status of the Creole peoples in the eyes of prior European colonial powers, creole languages have generally been regarded as "degenerate" languages, or at best as rudimentary "dialects" of the politically dominant parent languages. Because of this, the word "creole" was generally used by linguists in opposition to "language", rather than as a qualifier for it.

Another factor that may have contributed to the relative neglect of creole languages in linguistics is that they do not fit the 19th-century neogrammarian "tree model" for the evolution of languages, and its postulated regularity of sound changes (these critics including the earliest advocates of the wave model, Johannes Schmidt and Hugo Schuchardt, the forerunners of modern sociolinguistics). This controversy of the late 19th century profoundly shaped modern approaches to the comparative method in historical linguistics and in creolistics.

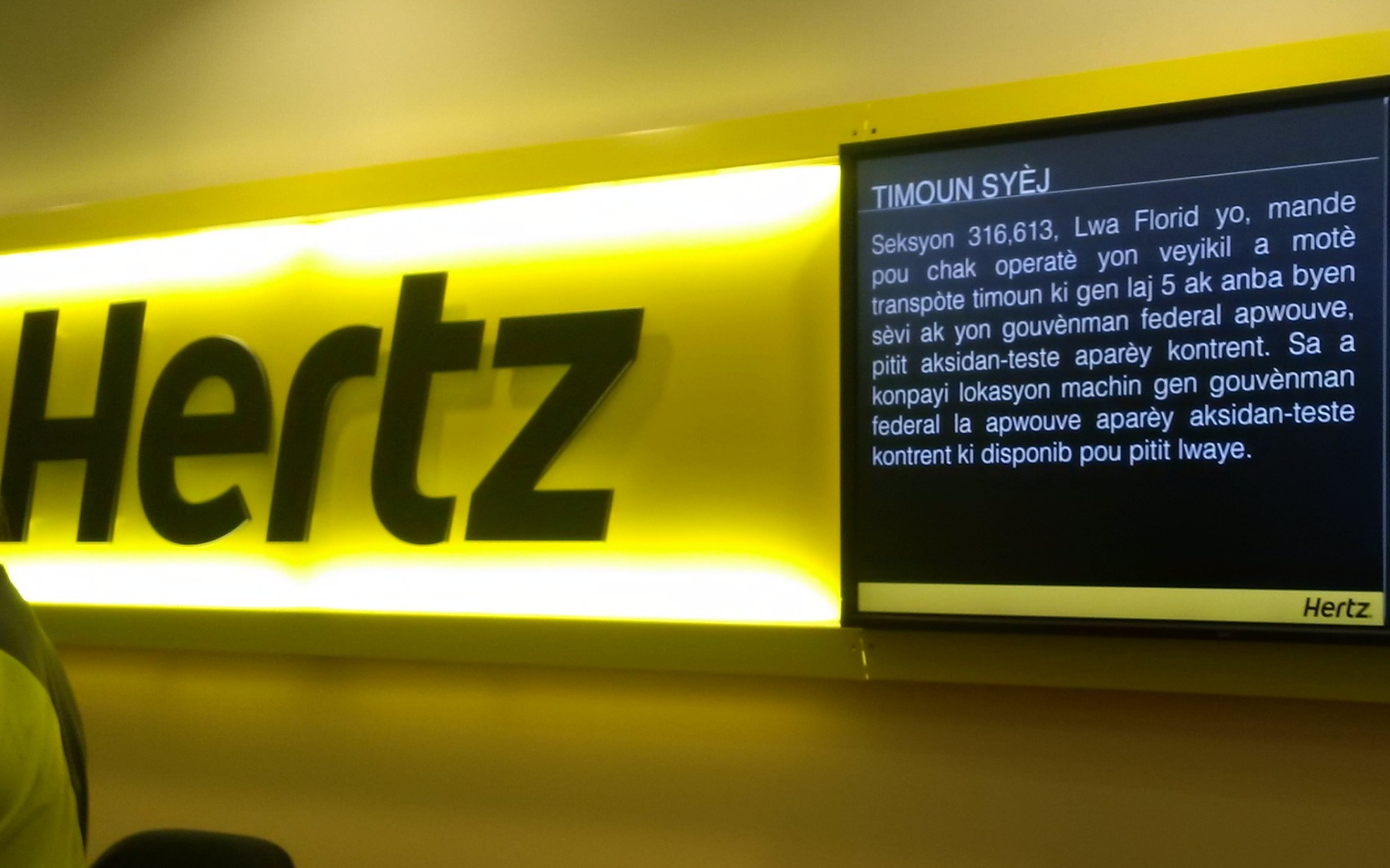
Haitian Creole in use at car rental counter in Florida, U.S. in 2014

Because of social, political, and academic changes brought on by decolonization in the second half of the 20th century, creole languages have experienced revivals in the past few decades. They are increasingly being used in print and film, and in many cases, their community prestige has improved dramatically. In fact, some have been standardized, and are used in local schools and universities around the world. At the same time, linguists have begun to accept that creole languages are in no way inferior to other languages. The terms "creole" or "creole language" are now used for any language suspected to have undergone creolization, and no longer imply any geographic restrictions nor ethnic prejudices.

There is controversy about the extent to which creolization influenced the evolution of African-American Vernacular English (AAVE). In the American education system, as well as in the past, the use of the word ebonics to refer to AAVE mirrors the historical negative connotation of the word creole.

== Classification ==
=== Historic classification ===
According to their external history, four types of creoles have been distinguished: plantation creoles, fort creoles, maroon creoles, and creolized pidgins. By the very nature of a creole language, the phylogenetic classification of a particular creole usually is a matter of dispute; especially when the pidgin precursor and its parent tongues (which may have been other creoles or pidgins) have disappeared before they could be documented.

Phylogenetic classification traditionally relies on inheritance of the lexicon, especially of "core" terms, and of the grammar structure. However, in creoles, the core lexicon often has mixed origin, and the grammar is largely original. For these reasons, the issue of which language is the parent of a creole – that is, whether a language should be classified as a "French creole", "Portuguese creole" or "English creole", etc. – often has no definitive answer, and can become the topic of long-lasting controversies, where social prejudices and political considerations may interfere with scientific discussion.

=== Substrate and superstrate ===
The terms substrate and superstrate are often used when two languages interact. However, the meaning of these terms is reasonably well-defined only in second language acquisition or language replacement events, when the native speakers of a certain source language (the substrate) are somehow compelled to abandon it for another target language (the superstrate). The outcome of such an event is that previous speakers of the substrate will use some version of the superstrate, at least in more formal contexts. The substrate may survive as a second language for informal conversation. As demonstrated by the fate of many replaced European languages (such as Etruscan, Breton, and Venetian), the influence of the substrate on the official speech is often limited to pronunciation and a modest number of loanwords. The substrate might even disappear altogether without leaving any trace.

However, there is dispute over the extent to which the terms "substrate" and "superstrate" are applicable to the genesis or the description of creole languages. The language replacement model may not be appropriate in creole formation contexts, where the emerging language is derived from multiple languages without any one of them being imposed as a replacement for any other. The substratum–superstratum distinction becomes awkward when multiple superstrata must be assumed (such as in Papiamento), when the substratum cannot be identified, or when the presence or the survival of substratal evidence is inferred from mere typological analogies. On the other hand, the distinction may be meaningful when the contributions of each parent language to the resulting creole can be shown to be very unequal, in a scientifically meaningful way. In the literature on Atlantic Creoles, "superstrate" usually means European and "substrate" non-European or African.

=== Decreolization ===
Since creole languages rarely attain official status, the speakers of a fully formed creole may eventually feel compelled to conform their speech to one of the parent languages. This decreolization process typically brings about a post-creole speech continuum characterized by large-scale variation and hypercorrection in the language.

It is generally acknowledged that creoles have a simpler grammar and more internal variability than older, more established languages. However, these notions are occasionally challenged. (See also language complexity.)

Phylogenetic or typological comparisons of creole languages have led to divergent conclusions. Similarities are usually higher among creoles derived from related languages, such as the languages of Europe, than among broader groups that include also creoles based on non-Indo-European languages (like Nubi or Sango). French-based creole languages in turn are more similar to each other (and to varieties of French) than to other European-based creoles. It was observed, in particular, that definite articles are mostly prenominal in English-based creole languages and English whereas they are generally postnominal in French creoles and in the variety of French that was exported to what is now Quebec in the 17th and 18th century. Moreover, the European languages which gave rise to the creole languages of European colonies all belong to the same subgroup of Western Indo-European and have highly convergent grammars; to the point that Whorf joined them into a single Standard Average European language group. French and English are particularly close, since English, through extensive borrowing, is typologically closer to French than to other Germanic languages. Thus the claimed similarities between creoles may be mere consequences of similar parentage, rather than characteristic features of all creoles.

== Creole genesis ==
There are a variety of theories on the origin of creole languages, all of which attempt to explain the similarities among them. Arends, Muysken & Smith (1995) outline a fourfold classification of explanations regarding creole genesis:

1. Theories focusing on European input
2. Theories focusing on non-European input
3. Gradualist and developmental hypotheses
4. Universalist approaches

In addition to the precise mechanism of creole genesis, a more general debate has developed whether creole languages are characterized by different mechanisms than traditional languages (which is McWhorter's 2018 main point) or whether in that regard creole languages develop by the same mechanisms as any other languages (e.g. DeGraff 2001).

=== Theories focusing on European input ===
==== Monogenetic theory of pidgins and creoles ====
The monogenetic theory of pidgins and creoles hypothesizes that all Atlantic creoles derived from a single Mediterranean Lingua Franca, via a West African Pidgin Portuguese of the seventeenth century, relexified in the so-called "slave factories" of Western Africa that were the source of the Atlantic slave trade. This theory was originally formulated by Hugo Schuchardt in the late nineteenth century and popularized in the late 1950s and early 1960s by Taylor, Whinnom, Thompson, and Stewart. However, this hypothesis is now not widely accepted, since it relies on all creole-speaking slave populations being based on the same Portuguese-based creole, despite no to very little historical exposure to Portuguese for many of these populations, no strong direct evidence for this claim, and with Portuguese leaving almost no trace on the lexicon of most of them, with the similarities in grammar explainable by analogous processes of loss of inflection and grammatical forms not common to European and West African languages. For example, Bickerton (1977) points out that relexification postulates too many improbabilities and that it is unlikely that a language "could be disseminated round the entire tropical zone, to peoples of widely differing language background, and still preserve a virtually complete identity in its grammatical structure wherever it took root, despite considerable changes in its phonology and virtually complete changes in its lexicon".

==== Domestic origin hypothesis ====
Proposed by Hancock (1985) for the origin of English-based creoles of the West Indies, the domestic origin hypothesis argues that, towards the end of the 16th century, English-speaking traders began to settle in the Gambia and Sierra Leone rivers as well as in neighboring areas such as the Bullom and Sherbro coasts. These settlers intermarried with the local population leading to mixed populations, and, as a result of this intermarriage, an English pidgin was created. This pidgin was learned by slaves in slave depots, who later on took it to the West Indies and formed one component of the emerging English creoles.

==== European dialect origin hypothesis ====
The French creoles are the foremost candidates to being the outcome of "normal" linguistic change and their creoleness to be sociohistoric in nature and relative to their colonial origin. Within this theoretical framework, a French creole is a language phylogenetically based on French, more specifically on a 17th-century koiné French extant in Paris, the French Atlantic harbors, and the nascent French colonies. Supporters of this hypothesis suggest that the non-Creole French dialects still spoken in many parts of the Americas share mutual descent from this single koiné. These dialects are found in Canada (mostly in Québec and in Acadian communities), Louisiana, Saint-Barthélemy and as isolates in other parts of the Americas. Approaches under this hypothesis are compatible with gradualism in change and models of imperfect language transmission in koiné genesis.

==== Foreigner talk and baby talk ====
The Foreigner Talk (FT) hypothesis argues that a pidgin or creole language forms when native speakers attempt to simplify their language in order to address speakers who do not know their language at all. Because of the similarities found in this type of speech and speech directed to a small child, it is also sometimes called baby talk.

Arends, Muysken & Smith (1995) suggest that four different processes are involved in creating Foreigner Talk:

- Accommodation
- Imitation
- Telegraphic condensation
- Conventions

This could explain why creole languages have much in common, while avoiding a monogenetic model. However, Hinnenkamp (1984), in analyzing German Foreigner Talk, claims that it is too inconsistent and unpredictable to provide any model for language learning.

While the simplification of input was supposed to account for creoles' simple grammar, commentators have raised a number of criticisms of this explanation:

1. There are a great many grammatical similarities amongst pidgins and creoles despite having very different lexifier languages.
2. Grammatical simplification can be explained by other processes, i.e. the innate grammar of Bickerton's language bioprogram theory.
3. Speakers of a creole's lexifier language often fail to understand, without learning the language, the grammar of a pidgin or creole.
4. Pidgins are more often used amongst speakers of different substrate languages than between such speakers and those of the lexifier language.

Another problem with the FT explanation is its potential circularity. Bloomfield (1933) points out that FT is often based on the imitation of the incorrect speech of the non-natives, that is the pidgin. Therefore, one may be mistaken in assuming that the former gave rise to the latter.

==== Imperfect L2 learning ====
The imperfect L2 (second language) learning hypothesis claims that pidgins are primarily the result of the imperfect L2 learning of the dominant lexifier language by the slaves. Research on naturalistic L2 processes has revealed a number of features of "interlanguage systems" that are also seen in pidgins and creoles:

- invariant verb forms derived from the infinitive or the least marked finite verb form;
- loss of determiners or use of demonstrative pronouns, adjectives or adverbs as determiners;
- placement of a negative particle in preverbal position;
- use of adverbs to express modality;
- fixed single word order with no inversion in questions;
- reduced or absent nominal plural marking.

Imperfect L2 learning is compatible with other approaches, notably the European dialect origin hypothesis and the universalist models of language transmission.

=== Theories focusing on non-European input ===
Theories focusing on the substrate, or non-European, languages attribute similarities amongst creoles to the similarities of African substrate languages. These features are often assumed to be transferred from the substrate language to the creole or to be preserved invariant from the substrate language in the creole through a process of relexification: the substrate language replaces the native lexical items with lexical material from the superstrate language while retaining the native grammatical categories. The problem with this explanation is that the postulated substrate languages differ amongst themselves and with creoles in meaningful ways. Bickerton (1981) argues that the number and diversity of African languages and the paucity of a historical record on creole genesis makes determining lexical correspondences a matter of chance. Dillard (1970) coined the term "cafeteria principle" to refer to the practice of arbitrarily attributing features of creoles to the influence of substrate African languages or assorted substandard dialects of European languages.

For a representative debate on this issue, see the contributions to Mufwene (1993); for a more recent view, Parkvall (2000).

Because of the sociohistoric similarities amongst many (but by no means all) of the creoles, the Atlantic slave trade and the plantation system of the European colonies have been emphasized as factors by linguists such as McWhorter (1999).

=== Gradualist and developmental hypotheses ===
One class of creoles might start as pidgins, rudimentary second languages improvised for use between speakers of two or more non-intelligible native languages. Keith Whinnom (in Hymes (1971)) suggests that pidgins need three languages to form, with one (the superstrate) being clearly dominant over the others. The lexicon of a pidgin is usually small and drawn from the vocabularies of its speakers, in varying proportions. Morphological details like word inflections, which usually take years to learn, are omitted; the syntax is kept very simple, usually based on strict word order. In this initial stage, all aspects of the speech – syntax, lexicon, and pronunciation – tend to be quite variable, especially with regard to the speaker's background.

If a pidgin manages to be learned by the children of a community as a native language, it may become fixed and acquire a more complex grammar, with fixed phonology, syntax, morphology, and syntactic embedding. Pidgins can become full languages in only a single generation. "Creolization" is this second stage where the pidgin language develops into a fully developed native language. The vocabulary, too, will develop to contain more and more items according to a rationale of lexical enrichment.

=== Universalist approaches ===
Universalist models stress the intervention of specific general processes during the transmission of language from generation to generation and from speaker to speaker. The process invoked varies: a general tendency towards semantic transparency, first-language learning driven by universal process, or a general process of discourse organization. Bickerton's language bioprogram theory, proposed in the 1980s, remains the main universalist theory. Bickerton claims that creoles are inventions of the children growing up on newly founded plantations. Around them, they only heard pidgins spoken, without enough structure to function as natural languages; and the children used their own innate linguistic capacities to transform the pidgin input into a full-fledged language. The alleged common features of all creoles would then stem from those innate abilities being universal.

== Recent studies ==
The last decades have seen the emergence of some new questions about the nature of creoles: in particular, the question of how complex creoles are and the question of whether creoles are indeed "exceptional" languages.

=== Creole prototype ===
Some features that distinguish creole languages from noncreoles have been proposed (by Bickerton, for example).

John McWhorter has proposed the following list of features as defining the creole prototype, that is, any language born recently of a pidgin:

- a lack of contextual inflection, that is, a lack of inflection that marks only agreement in case or gender (as opposed to inherent inflection that marks tense, mood or number);
- a lack of functional tone marking, that is, a lack of tone that serves to distinguish lexical items (e.g. Mandarin Chinese mā 'mother' vs. mǎ 'horse') or to encode grammatical features; and
- a lack of semantically opaque word formation, that is, a lack of words like "understand" or "make up", the meaning of which is not analyzable in terms of the meanings of their components.

McWhorter argues that the absence of these three features is predictable in languages that were born recently of a pidgin, since learning them would constitute a distinct challenge to the non-native speaker. Over the course of generations, however, such features would be expected to gradually (re-)appear, and therefore "many creoles would harbor departures from the Prototype identifiable as having happened after the creole was born" (McWhorter 2018). As one example, McWhorter (2013) notes that the creole Sranan, which has existed for centuries in a diglossic relationship with Dutch, has borrowed some Dutch verbs containing the ver- prefix (fer- in Sranan) and whose meaning is not analyzable; for instance the pair morsu 'to soil', fermorsu 'to squander'.

McWhorter claims that these three properties characterize any language that was born recently as a pidgin, and states "At this writing, in twenty years I have encountered not a single counterexample" (McWhorter 2018). Nevertheless, the existence of a creole prototype has been disputed by others:

- Henri Wittmann (1999) and David Gil (2001) argue that languages such as Manding, Soninke, Magoua French and Riau Indonesian have all these three features but show none of the sociohistoric traits of creole languages. McWhorter (2011, 2018) disagrees: for instance, he points out that Soninke has "a goodly amount" of inherent (i.e. non-contextual) inflection, that Magoua "retains ample marking of gender, person and number distinctions on verbs as well as conjugational classes" and therefore that these languages should not be considered creoles.
- Others (see overview in Muysken & Law (2001)) have claimed the existence of creoles that serve as counterexamples to McWhorter's hypothesis – the existence of inflectional morphology in Berbice Dutch Creole, for example, or tone in Papiamentu. Again, McWhorter (2018) disagrees. For instance, he points out that the use of tone in Papiamentu to distinguish participial verb forms from base ones appeared only after extensive contact with native Spanish speakers.

=== Exceptionalism ===
Building up on this discussion, McWhorter proposed that "the world's simplest grammars are Creole grammars", claiming that every noncreole language's grammar is at least as complex as any creole language's grammar. Gil has replied that Riau Indonesian has a simpler grammar than Saramaccan, the language McWhorter uses as a showcase for his theory. The same objections were raised by Wittmann in his 1999 debate with McWhorter.

The lack of progress made in defining creoles in terms of their morphology and syntax has led scholars such as Robert Chaudenson, Salikoko Mufwene, Michel DeGraff, and Henri Wittmann to question the value of creole as a typological class; they argue that creoles are structurally no different from any other language, and that creole is a sociohistoric concept – not a linguistic one – encompassing displaced populations and slavery.

Thomason & Kaufman (1988) spell out the idea of creole exceptionalism, claiming that creole languages are an instance of nongenetic language change due to language shift with abnormal transmission. Gradualists question the abnormal transmission of languages in a creole setting and argue that the processes which created today's creole languages are no different from universal patterns of language change.

Given these objections to creole as a concept, DeGraff and others question the idea that creoles are exceptional in any meaningful way. Additionally, Mufwene (2002) argues that some Romance languages are potential creoles but that they are not considered as such by linguists because of a historical bias against such a view.

== Controversy ==
Creolistics investigates the relative creoleness of languages suspected to be creoles, what Edgar Schneider calls "the cline of creoleness". No consensus exists among creolists as to whether the nature of creoleness is prototypical or merely evidence indicative of a set of recognizable phenomena seen in association with little inherent unity and no underlying single cause.

=== "Creole", a sociohistoric concept ===
Creoleness is at the heart of the controversy with John McWhorter and Mikael Parkvall opposing Henri Wittmann (1999) and Michel DeGraff. In McWhorter's definition, creoleness is a matter of degree, in that prototypical creoles exhibit all of the three traits he proposes to diagnose creoleness: little or no inflection, little or no tone, and transparent derivation. In McWhorter's view, less prototypical creoles depart somewhat from this prototype. Along these lines, McWhorter defines Haitian Creole, exhibiting all three traits, as "the most creole of creoles". A creole like Palenquero, on the other hand, would be less prototypical, given the presence of inflection to mark plural, past, gerund, and participle forms. Objections to the McWhorter–Parkvall hypotheses point out that these typological parameters of creoleness can be found in languages such as Manding, Sooninke, and Magoua French, which are not considered creoles. Wittmann and DeGraff come to the conclusion that efforts to conceive a yardstick for measuring creoleness in any scientifically meaningful way have failed so far. Gil (2001) comes to the same conclusion for Riau Indonesian. Muysken & Law (2001) have adduced evidence as to creole languages which respond unexpectedly to one of McWhorter's three features (for example, inflectional morphology in Berbice Creole Dutch, tone in Papiamentu). Mufwene (2000) and Wittmann (2001) have argued further that Creole languages are structurally no different from any other language, and that Creole is in fact a sociohistoric concept (and not a linguistic one), encompassing displaced population and slavery. DeGraff & Walicek (2005) discuss creolistics in relation to colonialist ideologies, rejecting the notion that Creoles can be responsibly defined in terms of specific grammatical characteristics. They discuss the history of linguistics and nineteenth-century work that argues for the consideration of the sociohistorical contexts in which Creole languages emerged.

=== "Creole", a genuine linguistic concept ===
On the other hand, McWhorter points out that in languages such as Bambara, essentially a dialect of Manding, there is ample non-transparent derivation, and that there is no reason to suppose that this would be absent in close relatives such as Mandinka itself. Moreover, he also observes that Soninke has what all linguists would analyze as inflections, and that current lexicography of Soninke is too elementary for it to be stated with authority that it does not have non-transparent derivation. Meanwhile, Magoua French, as described by Henri Wittmann, retains some indication of grammatical gender, which qualifies as inflection, and it also retains non-transparent derivation. Michel DeGraff's argument has been that Haitian Creole retains non-transparent derivation from French.

=== Additional resources ===
Ansaldo, Matthews & Lim (2007) critically assesses the proposal that creole languages exist as a homogeneous structural type with shared and/ or peculiar origins.

Arends, Muysken & Smith (1995) groups creole genesis theories into four categories:

- Theories focusing on the European input
- Theories focusing on the non-European input
- Gradualist and developmental hypotheses
- Universalist approaches

The authors also confine Pidgins and mixed languages into separate chapters outside this scheme whether or not relexification come into the picture.

== See also ==
- Criollo people
- Diglossia
- Language contact
- Lingua franca
- List of creole languages
- Macaronic language
- Middle English creole hypothesis
- Nation language
- Nicaraguan Sign Language
- Trading zones (metaphor) – Metaphor applied to collaborations in science
- Amer-Afro diasporic creoles

=== Creoles by parent language ===
- Arabic-based creole languages
- Assamese-based: Nagamese
- Bengali-Meitei creole: Bishnupriya Manipuri
- Chinese-based creole languages
- Dutch-based creole languages
- English-based creole languages
- French-based creole languages
- German-based creole languages
- Hindi-based: Andaman Creole Hindi
- Japanese-based creole languages
- Kongo-based: Kituba
- Malay-based creole languages
- Ngbandi-based: Sango
- Portuguese-based creole languages
- Spanish-based creole languages
- Sinhala-based: Vedda
- Swahili-based: Kutchi-Swahili

== Bibliography ==
- Anderson, Roger W., ed. (1983), Pidginization and Creolization as Language Acquisition, Rowley, MA: Newbury House
- Ansaldo, U.; Matthews, S. (2007), "Deconstructing creole: The rationale", Typological Studies in Language, vol. 73, pp. 1–20, doi:10.1075/tsl.73.02ans, ISBN 978-90-272-2985-4, ISSN 0167-7373
- Ansaldo, Umberto; Matthews, Stephen; Lim, Lisa (2007), Deconstructing Creole, Amsterdam: Benjamins
- Arends, Jacques; Muysken, Pieter; Smith, Norval (1995), Pidgins and creoles: An introduction, Amsterdam: Benjamins
- Bailey, Charles J; Maroldt, Karl (1977), "The French lineage of English", in Meisel, Jürgen (ed.), Langues en Contact – Pidgins – Creoles, Tübingen: Narr, pp. 21–53
- Bickerton, Derek (1977). "Pidginization and creolization: Language acquisition and language universals". In A. Valdman (ed.). Pidgin and creole languages. Bloomington: Indiana University Press. pp. 49–69.
- Bickerton, Derek (1981), Roots of Language, Karoma Publishers, ISBN 0-89720-044-6
- Bickerton, Derek (1983), "Creole Languages", Scientific American, 249 (8): 116–122, Bibcode:1983SciAm.249a.116B, doi:10.1038/scientificamerican0783-116, JSTOR 24968948
- Bickerton, Derek (1984), "The language bioprogram hypothesis", The Behavioral and Brain Sciences, 7 (2): 173–188, doi:10.1017/S0140525X00044149, S2CID 144264276
- Bickerton, Derek (1988), "Creole languages and the bioprogram", in Newmeyer, F.J. (ed.), Linguistics: The Cambridge survey, vol. 2, Cambridge: Cambridge University Press
- Bickerton, Derek (1991), "On the Supposed 'Gradualness' of Creole Development", Journal of Pidgin and Creole Languages, 6: 25–58, doi:10.1075/jpcl.6.1.03bic
- Bloomfield, L. (1933), Language, New York: Henry Holt
- DeCamp, David (1977), "The Development of Pidgin and Creole Studies", in Valdman, Albert (ed.), Pidgin and Creole Linguistics, Bloomington: Indiana University Press, pp. 3–20
- DeGraff, Michel (2001), "On the origin of creoles: A Cartesian critique of Neo-Darwinian linguistics", Linguistic Typology, 5 (2–3): 213–310
- DeGraff, Michel (2002), "Relexification: A reevaluation" (PDF), Linguistic Anthropology, 44 (4): 321–414
- DeGraff, Michel (2003), "Against Creole Exceptionalism" (PDF), Language, 79 (2): 391–410, doi:10.1353/lan.2003.0114, S2CID 47857823
- DeGraff, Michel (2004), "Against Creole Exceptionalism (redux)" (PDF), Language, 80 (4): 834–839, doi:10.1353/lan.2004.0178, S2CID 143265334
- DeGraff, Michel (2005), "Do creole languages constitute an exceptional typological class?", Revue Française de Linguistique Appliquée, 10 (1): 11–24, doi:10.3917/rfla.101.24, S2CID 60957821
- DeGraff, Michel; Walicek, Don E. (2005). "Creole Exceptionalism and Accidents of History". Sargasso: Creolistics and Caribbean Languages. 2004–2005. Archived from the original on 2023-10-08.
- Dillard, J.L. (1970), "Principles in the history of American English: Paradox, virginity, and cafeteria", Florida Foreign Language Reporter, 8: 32–33
- Feist, Sigmund (1932), "The Origin of the Germanic Languages and the Europeanization of North Europe", Language, 8 (4): 245–254, doi:10.2307/408831, JSTOR 408831
- Ferguson, C.A. (1971), "Absence of Copula and the Notion of Simplicity: A Study of Normal Speech, Baby Talk, Foreigner Talk and Pidgins", in Hymes, D. (ed.), Pidginization and Creolization of Languages, Cambridge: Cambridge University Press
- Fournier, Robert; Wittmann, Henri, eds. (1995), Le Français des Amériques, Trois-Rivières: Presses universitaires de Trois-Rivières, ISBN 2-9802307-2-3
- Fournier, Robert (1998), "Des créolismes dans la distribution des déterminants et des complémenteurs en français québécois basilectal", in Patrice Brasseur (ed.), Français d'Amérique: variation, créolisation, normalisation, Université d'Avignon: Centre d'études canadiennes, pp. 217–228
- Hamilton, A. Cris; Coslett, H. Branch (2008), "Role of inflectional regularity and semantic transparency in reading morphologically complex words: Evidence from acquired dyslexia", Neurocase, 14 (4): 347–368, doi:10.1080/13554790802368679, PMID 18792839, S2CID 44889915
- Geeslin, Kimberly L. (2002), "Semantic transparency as a predictor of copula choice in second-language acquisition", Linguistics, 40 (2): 439–468, doi:10.1515/ling.2002.019
- Gil, David (2001), "Creoles, Complexity and Riau Indonesian", Linguistic Typology, 5: 325–371
- Givón, Talmy (1979), "Prolegomena to any sane creology", in Hancock, Ian (ed.), Readings in Creole Studies, pp. 3–35
- Hall, Robert A. (1966), Pidgin and Creole Languages, Ithaca: Cornell University
- Hall, Robert A. (1974), External History of the Romance Languages, New York: American Elsevier Publishing Company
- Hancock, Ian F. (1985), "The domestic hypothesis, diffusion and componentiality: An account of Anglophone creole origins", in Pieter Muysken; Norval Smith (eds.), Substrata Versus Universals in Creole Genesis, Amsterdam: Benjamins, pp. 71–102
- Hinnenkamp, V. (1984), "Eye-witnessing pidginization: Structural and Sociolinguistic Aspects of German and Turkish Foreigner Talk", in Sebba, M.; Todd, L. (eds.), Papers from the York Creole Conference, September 24–27, 1983, York Papers in Linguistics
- Holm, John (1988), Pidgins and Creoles, vol. 1, Cambridge: Cambridge University Press
- Hymes, D. H. (1971), Pidginization and Creolization of Languages, Cambridge University Press
- Jungemann, Fréderic H. (1955), La Teoría del substrato y los dialectos hispano-romances y gascones, Madrid
- Lefebvre, Claire (2002), "The emergence of productive morphology in creole languages: the case of Haitian Creole", Yearbook of Morphology: 35–80
- Martinet, André (1964) [1955], Économie des Changements Phonétiques: traité de phonologie diachronique, Berne: Francke
- McWhorter, John H. (1998), "Identifying the creole prototype: Vindicating a typological class", Language, 74 (4): 788–818, doi:10.2307/417003, JSTOR 417003
- McWhorter, John H. (1999), "The Afrogenesis Hypothesis of Plantation Creole Origin", in Huber, M; Parkvall, M (eds.), Spreading the Word: The Issue of Diffusion among the Atlantic Creoles, London: University of Westminster Press
- McWhorter, John H. (2000), The Missing Spanish Creoles: recovering the birth of plantation contact languages, Berkeley: University of California Press
- McWhorter, John H. (2005), Defining Creole, Oxford: Oxford University Press
- McWhorter, John H. (2011), "Tying up loose ends: the creole prototype after all", Diachronica, 28 (1): 82–117, doi:10.1075/dia.28.1.04mcw
- McWhorter, John H. (2013), "Why noncompositional derivation isn't boring: A second try on the 'other' part of the Creole prototype hypothesis.", Journal of Pidgin and Creole Languages, 28 (1): 167–179, doi:10.1075/jpcl.28.1.08mcw
- Meijer, Guus; Muysken, Pieter (1977), "On the beginnings of pidgin and creole studies: Schuchardt and Hesseling", in Valdman, Albert (ed.), Pidgin and Creole Linguistics, Bloomington: Indiana University Press, pp. 21–45
- Mufwene, Salikoko, ed. (1993), Africanisms in Afro-American Language Varieties, Athens: University of Georgia Press
- Mufwene, Salikoko (2000), "Creolization is a social, not a structural, process", in Neumann-Holzschuh, Ingrid; Schneider, Edgar (eds.), Degrees of restructuring in creole languages, Amsterdam: John Benjamins, pp. 65–84
- Mufwene, Salikoko (2002), The Ecology of Language Evolution, Cambridge: Cambridge University Press
- Muysken, Pieter; Law, Paul (2001), "Creole studies: A theoretical linguist's field guide", Glot International, 5 (2): 47–57
- Parkvall, Mikael (2000), Out of Africa: African influences in Atlantic Creoles, London: Battlebridge
- Parkvall, Mikael (2001), "Creolistics and the quest for Creoleness: A reply to Claire Lefebvre", Journal of Pidgin and Creole Languages, 16 (1): 147–151, doi:10.1075/jpcl.16.1.07par
- Schumann, John H. (1978), The Pidginization Process: A Model for Second Language Acquisition, Rowley, MA: Newbury House
- Sebba, Mark (1997), Contact Languages: Pidgins and Creoles, MacMillan, ISBN 0-333-63024-6
- Seuren, Pieter A.M.; Wekker, Herman C. (1986), "Semantic transparency as a factor in creole genesis", in Muysken, Pieter; Smith, Norval (eds.), Substrata Versus Universals in Creole Genesis, Amsterdam: Benjamins, pp. 57–70
- Singler, John Victor (1983), "The influence of African languages on pidgins and creoles", in Kaye, Jonathan; Koopman, H.; Sportiche, D.; et al. (eds.), Current Approaches to African Linguistics, vol. 2, Dordrecht: Foris, pp. 65–77, ISBN 90-70176-95-5
- Singler, John Victor (1988), "The homogeneity of the substrate as a factor in pidgin/creole genesis", Language, 64 (1): 27–51, doi:10.2307/414784, JSTOR 414784
- Singler, John Victor (1996), "Theories of creole genesis, sociohistorical considerations, and the evaluation of evidence: The case of Haitian Creole and the Relexification Hypothesis", Journal of Pidgin and Creole Languages, 11 (2): 185–230, doi:10.1075/jpcl.11.2.02sin
- Stewart, William A. (1962), "Creole languages in the Caribbean", in F.A. Rice (ed.), Study of the Role of Second Languages, Washington, D.C.: Center for Applied Linguistics, pp. 34–53
- Taylor, Douglas (1977), Languages in the West Indies, Baltimore: Johns Hopkins University Press
- Thompson, R.W. (1961), "A note on some possible affinities between the creole dialects of the Old World and those of the New", Creole Language Studies, 2: 107–113
- Thomason, Sarah; Kaufman, Terrence (1988), Language Contact, Creolization, and Genetic Linguistics (first ed.), Berkeley: University of California Press
- Traugott, Elizabeth Closs (1977), "The Development of Pidgin and Creole Studies", in Valdman, Theo (ed.), Pidgin and Creole Linguistics, Bloomington: Indiana University Press, pp. 70–98
- Vennemann, Theo (2003), "Languages in prehistoric Europe north of the Alps", in Bammesberger, Alfred; Vennemann, Theo (eds.), Languages in Prehistoric Europe, Heidelberg: C. Winter, pp. 319–332
- Wardhaugh, Ronald (2002), "Pidgins and Creoles", An Introduction to Sociolinguistics (fourth ed.), Blackwell Publishing, pp. 57–86
- Weinreich, Uriel (1979) [1953], Languages in Contact: Findings and Problems, New York: Mouton Publishers, ISBN 978-90-279-2689-0
- Whinnom, Keith (1956), Spanish Contact Vernaculars in the Philippine Islands, Hong Kong
- Whinnom, Keith (1965), "The origin of the European-based creoles and pidgins", Orbis, 14: 509–27
- Whorf, Benjamin (1956), John Carroll (ed.), Language, Thought, and Reality: Selected Writings of Benjamin Lee Whorf, Cambridge: MIT Press
- Winford, D (1997), "Creole Formation in the Context of Contact Languages", Journal of Pidgin and Creole Languages, 12 (1): 131–151, doi:10.1075/jpcl.12.1.06win
- Wittmann, Henri (1973), "Le joual, c'est-tu un créole?" (PDF), La Linguistique, 9 (2): 83–93
- Wittmann, Henri (1995), "Grammaire comparée des variétés coloniales du français populaire de Paris du 17e siècle et origines du français québécois" (PDF), in Fournier, Robert; Wittmann, Henri (eds.), Le Français des Amériques, Trois-Rivières: Presses universitaires de Trois-Rivières, pp. 281–334
- Wittmann, Henri (1996), "La forme phonologique comparée du parler magoua de la région de Trois-Rivières" (PDF), in Fournier, Robert (ed.), Mélanges linguistiques, Revue québécoise de linguistique théorique et appliquée 13, Trois-Rivières: Presses universitaires de Trois-Rivières, pp. 225–43
- Wittmann, Henri (1998), "Les créolismes syntaxiques du français magoua parlé aux Trois-Rivières" (PDF), in Brasseur, Patrice (ed.), Français d'Amérique: variation, créolisation, normalisation (Actes du colloque, Université d'Avignon, 8-11 Oct.), Avignon: Université d'Avignon, Centre d'études canadiennes, pp. 229–48
- Wittmann, Henri (1999), "Prototype as a typological yardstick to creoleness", The Creolist Archives Papers On-Line, Stockholms Universitet
- Wittmann, Henri (2001). "CreoList debate, parts I-VI, appendixes 1-9". Lexical diffusion and the glottogenetics of creole French. The Linguist List. Eastern Michigan University & Wayne State University.
- Wittmann, Henri; Fournier, Robert (1996), "Contraintes sur la relexification: les limites imposées dans un cadre théorique minimaliste" (PDF), in Fournier, Robert (ed.), Mélanges linguistiques, Revue québécoise de linguistique théorique et appliquée 13, Trois-Rivières: Presses universitaires de Trois-Rivières, pp. 245–280

=== Further reading ===
- Arends, Jacques; Muysken, Pieter; Smith, Norval (1995), Pidgins and Creoles: An introduction, Amsterdam: Benjamins, ISBN 90-272-5236-X
- Arends, Jacques (1989), Syntactic Developments in Sranan: Creolization as a gradual process, Nijmegen: Katholieke Universiteit ti Nijmegen, ISBN 90-900268-3-5
- Bakker, Peter; Borchsenius, Finn; Levisen, Carsten; Sippola, Eeva (2017), Creole Studies: Phylogenetic Approaches
- Bickerton, Derek (2009), Bastard Tongues: A Trailblazing Linguist Finds Clues to Our Common Humanity in the World's Lowliest Languages, Macmillan, ISBN 978-0-8090-2816-0
- DeGraff, Michel (2001), "On the origin of creoles: A Cartesian critique of Neo-Darwinian linguistics", Linguistic Typology, 5 (2–3): 213–310
- DeGraff, Michel (2002), "Relexification: A reevaluation" (PDF), Linguistic Anthropology, 44 (4): 321–414, JSTOR 30028860
- DeGraff, Michel (2003), "Against Creole Exceptionalism", Language, 79 (2): 391–410, doi:10.1353/lan.2003.0114, S2CID 47857823
- Eckkrammer, Eva (1994), "How to Pave the Way for the Emancipation of a Creole Language. Papiamentu, or What Can a Literature Do for its Language", in Hoogbergen, Wim (ed.), Born Out of Resistance. On Caribbean Cultural Creativity, Utrecht: Isor-Publications
- Fertel, Rien (2014), Imagining the Creole City: The Rise of Literary Culture in Nineteenth-Century New Orleans, Baton Rouge, LA: Louisiana State University Press
- Gil, David (2001), "Creoles, Complexity and Riau Indonesian", Linguistic Typology, 5: 325–371
- Good, Jeff (2004), "Tone and accent in Saramaccan: Charting a deep split in the phonology of a language", Lingua, 114 (5): 575–619, doi:10.1016/S0024-3841(03)00062-7, S2CID 18601673
- Holm, John (1989), Pidgins and Creoles, vol. 2, Cambridge: Cambridge University Press
- Hunter Smith, Norval Selby (1987), The Genesis of the Creole Languages of Surinam, Amsterdam: Universiteit van Amsterdam
- Lang, Jürgen (2009), Les langues des autres dans la créolisation: théorie et exemplification par le créole d'empreinte wolof à l'île Santiago du Cap Vert, Tübingen: Narr
- McWhorter, John H. (1998), "Identifying the creole prototype: Vindicating a typological class", Language, 74 (4): 788–818, doi:10.2307/417003, JSTOR 417003
- McWhorter, John H. (2005), Defining Creole, Oxford: Oxford University Press
- Meisel, Jürgen (1977), Langues en Contact – Pidgins – Creoles, Tübingen: Narr
- Mufwene, Salikoko (2000), "Creolization is a social, not a structural, process", in Neumann-Holzschuh, Ingrid; Schneider, Edgar (eds.), Degrees of Restructuring in Creole Languages, Amsterdam: John Benjamins, pp. 65–84
- Muysken, Pieter; Law, Paul (2001), "Creole studies: A theoretical linguist's field guide", Glot International, 5 (2): 47–57
- Parkvall, Mikael (2000), Out of Africa: African influences in Atlantic Creoles, London: Battlebridge
- Singler, John Victor (1988), "The homogeneity of the substrate as a factor in pidgin/creole genesis", Language, 64 (1): 27–51, doi:10.2307/414784, JSTOR 414784
- Singler, John Victor (1996), "Theories of creole genesis, sociohistorical considerations, and the evaluation of evidence: The case of Haitian Creole and the Relexification Hypothesis", Journal of Pidgin and Creole Languages, 11 (2): 185–230, doi:10.1075/jpcl.11.2.02sin
- Wittmann, Henri (1983), "Les réactions en chaîne en morphologie diachronique" (PDF), Actes du Colloque de la Société Internationale de Linguistique Fonctionnelle, 10: 285–92
- Wittmann, Henri (1998), "Le français de Paris dans le français des Amériques" (PDF), Proceedings of the International Congress of Linguists, 16, Amsterdam: Elsevier
- Wittmann, Henri (1999). "Prototype as a typological yardstick to creoleness." The Creolist Archives Papers On-Line, Stockholms Universitet.
- Wittmann, Henri (2001). "Lexical diffusion and the glottogenetics of creole French." CreoList debate, parts I-VI, appendixes 1–9. The Linguist List, Eastern Michigan University|Wayne State University
