= Roger Cardinal (art historian) =

Art historian who originated the term "outsider art"

- Born: 27 February 1940
- Died: 1 November 2019 (aged 79)
- Title: Professor

Academic background
- Education: University of Cambridge

Academic work
- Discipline: Literary and Visual Studies
- Institutions: University of Kent at Canterbury
- Main interests: surrealism, outsider art

Roger Cardinal (27 February 1940 – 1 November 2019) was a British professor at the University of Kent at Canterbury, England, and an art scholar who originated the term "outsider art".

== Career ==
He studied at St Dunstan's College in south London and attended Gonville and Caius College, Cambridge, as an undergraduate. His PhD, also at Cambridge, was on the surrealist conception of love. In 1965 he became an assistant professor in the French department of the University of Manitoba in Winnipeg, Canada. After a stint as a university lecturer at Warwick University, he moved to the University of Kent at Canterbury.

== Contributions ==
He was the author of books including Surrealism: Permanent Revelation (1970, with Robert Short) and Outsider Art (1972), and was professor of literary and visual studies at the University of Kent. Outsider Art was the first book in English to be published on the subject of art brut and introduced the term "outsider art". In 1979 he and Victor Musgrave curated Outsiders at the Hayward Gallery, London. Cardinal published widely on individual outsider artists and wrote essays on outsider architecture, prison art, autistic art, and memory painting. He was a contributing editor of Raw Vision and co-wrote Raw Erotica (2013) along with John Maizels and Colin Rhodes. Cardinal was also on the International Jury of the INSITA Triannual Exhibition, held in Slovakia.

== Bibliography ==
- Library of Congress: Cardinal, Roger
