= Salikoko Mufwene =

Congolese linguist

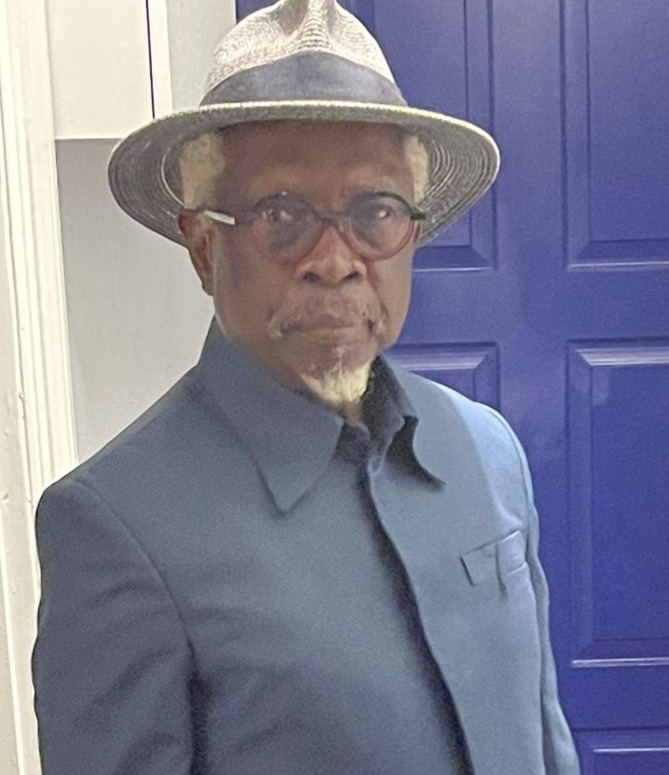
- Born: Salikoko S. Mufwene; Mbaya-Lareme, Democratic Republic of the Congo
- Known for: Ecological approach to language evolution; research on Gullah, Jamaican Creole, Bantu languages, and African-American Vernacular English
- Awards: Fellow of the Linguistic Society of America (2018); Fellow of the American Philosophical Society (2022); Fellow of the American Academy of Arts and Sciences (2023)

Academic background
- Education: Université nationale du Zaïre (BA); University of Chicago (PhD, 1979)

Academic work
- Institutions: University of Chicago; University of Georgia; University of the West Indies
- Notable works: The Ecology of Language Evolution (2001); Language Evolution: Contact, Competition and Change (2008); The Cambridge Handbook of Language Contact (2022)

Salikoko Sangol Mufwene is a linguist born in Mbaya-Lareme in the Democratic Republic of the Congo. He is the Edward Carson Waller Distinguished Service Professor at the University of Chicago, where he holds appointments in the Department of Linguistics, the Department of Race, Diaspora, and Indigeneity, and the College. He is recognized for his contributions to the study of creole languages, language evolution, and sociolinguistics.

== Early life and education ==
Mufwene completed his undergraduate studies in English philology at the Université nationale du Zaïre in Lubumbashi. He earned his Ph.D. in linguistics from the University of Chicago in 1979.

== Academic career ==
Mufwene began his academic career as a lecturer at the University of the West Indies, Mona campus, in Jamaica from January 1980 to August 1981. He then joined the University of Georgia, where he served as assistant professor from 1981 to 1986, associate professor from 1986 to 1991, and full professor in 1991 in the Department of Anthropology. In December that year, he moved to the University of Chicago as a full professor, where he has remained since.

At the University of Chicago, Mufwene served as Chair of the Department of Linguistics from 1995 to 2001. He was appointed the Frank J. McLorraine Distinguished Service Professor in 2004 and became the Edward Carson Waller Distinguished Service Professor in 2021. He also served as Academic Director of the University of Chicago Center in Paris from 2013 to 2014 and again from 2022 to 2023, as well as Interim Academic Director of the Center for the Study of Race, Politics, and Culture (CSRPC) from 2018 to 2020.

He is affiliated with several multidisciplinary programs at the University of Chicago, including the Committee on African Studies, the Committee on Evolutionary Biology, and the Committee on Conceptual and Historical Studies of Science.

=== Visiting appointments ===
Mufwene has held visiting appointments at the National University of Singapore (Fall 2001) and Harvard University (Spring 2002), was a fellow at the Institute for Advanced Study in Lyon (2010–11), and delivered lectures at the Collège de France (Fall 2003), where he later held the Chaire annuelle Mondes francophones (2023–24). He has also taught at the Summer Institute of the Linguistic Society of America (1999, 2015, 2017) and several summer schools on creoles, on language endangerment and loss, on economy and language, and on African linguistics.

== Research ==
Mufwene's research focuses on creole studies, language evolution (including language vitality), and African linguistics. He has published extensively (several books and hundreds of essays) on the development of creole languages, particularly Gullah and Jamaican Creole, on the morphosyntax of Bantu languages such as Kituba, Lingala, and Kiyansi. His work also addresses the structure and history of African American Vernacular English.

He is noted for advancing the ecological approach to language evolution, in which he analogizes languages to viruses at the mercy of their hosts (speakers and signers) influenced by sociocultural, historical, and environmental factors. In his seminal books The Ecology of Language Evolutions (2001) and Language Evolution: Contact, Competition and Change (2008), Mufwene draws analogies between mechanisms of language evolution and those of biological evolution, arguing that languages undergo changes through mechanisms similar to those affecting viruses, including dependence on the activities of their hosts, competition, and selection, which can facilitate spread or cause extinction. An important difference is that, unlike viruses, languages do not colonize their hosts, who are in fact also their creators. He conceives of languages as technologies produced by humans’ domestication of their anatomies to produce linguistic communication.

His contributions to the historical fold of evolutionary linguistics shed light on the role of colonization and globalization in shaping linguistic change and diversity. Invoking ecology-specific dynamics, he invokes differential evolution to explain why European colonial languages speciated into divergent varieties (creoles, pidgins, and other indigenized varieties) and why the processes of language endangerment and loss have not proceeded uniformly around the world.

Mufwene is the founding editor of the Cambridge Approaches to Language Contact series, which publishes interdisciplinary research on creoles, pidgins, other outcomes of language contact, and structural change in languages.

== Honors and Distinctions ==
- Médaille du Collège de France (2003)
- Fellow of the Linguistic Society of America (2018)
- Fellow of the American Philosophical Society (2022)
- Fellow of the American Academy of Arts and Sciences (2023)
- Chaire annuelle Mondes Francophones, Collège de France (2023–2024)

== Selected publications ==
=== Books ===
- Mufwene, Salikoko; Steever, Sanford; Walker, Carol (Eds.) (1976). Papers from the Twelfth Regional Meeting of the Chicago Linguistic Society. Chicago Linguistic Society.
- Mufwene, Salikoko S.; Rickford, John R.; Bailey, Guy; Baugh, John (Eds.) (1998). African-American English: Structure, history, and use. London: Routledge. ISBN 0-415-11732-1.
- Mufwene, Salikoko S. (Ed.) (1993). Africanisms in Afro-American language varieties. University of Georgia Press.
- Mufwene, Salikoko S.; Moshi, Lioba (Ed.) (1993). Topics in African linguistics. John Benjamins.
- Mufwene, Salikoko S. (2001). The Ecology of Language Evolution. Cambridge University Press. ISBN 0-511-01934-3.
- Mufwene, Salikoko S. (2005). Créoles, écologie sociale, évolution linguistique : cours donnés au Collège de France durant l’automne 2003. L’Harmattan.
- Mufwene, Salikoko S.; Francis, Elaine J.; Wheeler, Rebecca S. (Eds.) (2005) Polymorphous linguistics: Jim McCawley’s legacy. MIT Press.
- Mufwene, Salikoko (2008). Language Evolution: Contact, Competition and Change. Continuum Press. ISBN 978-0-8264-9370-5.
- Vigouroux, Cécile B.; Mufwene, Salikoko S. (Eds.) (2008). Globalization and language vitality: Perspectives from Africa. Continuum Press.
- Mufwene, Salikoko (Ed.) (2014). Iberian Imperialism and Language Evolution in Latin America. University of Chicago Press.
- Mufwene, Salikoko S.; Vigouroux, Cécile B. (Eds.) (2014). Colonisation, globalisation, vitalité du français. Odile Jacob (Paris).
- Mufwene, Salikoko S.; Coupé, Christophe; Pellegrino, François (Eds.) (2017). Complexity in Language: Developmental and Evolutionary Perspectives. Cambridge University Press.
- Vigouroux, Cécile B.; Mufwene, Salikoko (Eds.) (2020). Bridging Linguistics and Economics. Cambridge University Press.
- Mufwene, Salikoko; Escobar, Anna María (Eds.) (2022). The Cambridge Handbook of Language Contact. Volume 1: Population Movement and Language Change. Cambridge University Press.
- Mufwene, Salikoko; Escobar, Anna María (Eds.) (2022). The Cambridge Handbook of Language Contact. Volume 2: Multilingualism in Population Structure. Cambridge University Press.
- Mufwene, Salikoko S. (2024). Migrations humaines et évolution linguistique : les parcours des créoles et du français. Editions du Collège de France.
- Mufwene, Salikoko S. (2025) Ecological Perspectives on Language Endangerment and Loss. Springer Nature

=== Festschrift ===
- Aboh, Enoch Oladé; Vigouroux, Cécile B. (Eds.) (2021). Variation Rolls the Dice: A Worldwide Collage in honour of Salikoko S. Mufwene. John Benjamins.
