= Meisel =

Surname list

Meisel or Meisels is a surname. It has two main derivations, 1) from Yiddish mayzel 'little mouse,' especially in and from Southern Germany, and 2) Middle German meizel, meisel 'chisel,' a metonymic name for a woodcarver, stone mason, or surgeon. Families with the latter meaning can be German Catholics, Protestants, and Jews. Notable people with the surname include:

- Dominik Meisel (born 1999), German footballer
- Edmund Meisel (1894–1930), Austrian-born German composer
- Hana Meisel (1883–1972), Russian-born Israeli agronomist and Zionist
- Hilde Meisel (1914–1945), German Resistance writer
- Johanna Meisel, German film editor
- John Meisel (1923–2025), Austrian-born Canadian political scientist
- Jürgen M. Meisel (born 1944), German romanist and linguist
- Kurt Meisel (1912–1994), Austrian actor and film director
- Louis K. Meisel (born 1942), American photorealist art dealer
- Mordecai Meisel (1528–1601), Czech philanthropist and communal leader
- Noah Meisel (1891–1956), Russian-born Latvian politician
- Perry Meisel (born 1949), American writer and linguist
- Steven Meisel (born 1954), American fashion photographer
- Wilhelm Meisel (1891–1974), German Kriegsmarine admiral
- Wilhelm Meisel (Silesian Uprisings veteran) (1904–2009), Polish soldier, last known surviving veteran of the Silesian Uprisings
- Will Meisel (1897–1967), German composer
- Grete Meisel-Hess (1879–1922), Austrian feminist author
- Dow Ber Meisels (1798–1870), Polish rabbi and nationalist
- Esther Meisels (born 1995), Israeli cyclist
- Samuel J. Meisels (born 1945), American child development scholar
- Tamar Meisels, Israeli political scientist

== See also ==
- Meisel family
- Maisel
- Meisel Music, German music publishing group
- Mozart und Meisel, Austrian television series
