= Outsider art =

Art created outside the boundaries of official culture by those untrained in the arts

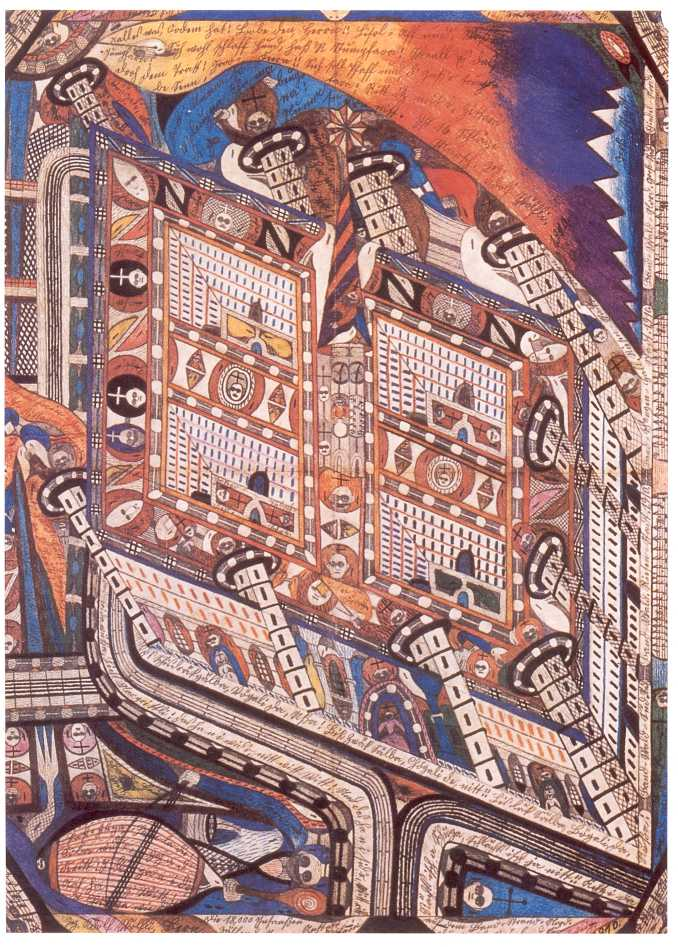
Adolf Wölfli's Irren-Anstalt Band-Hain, 1910

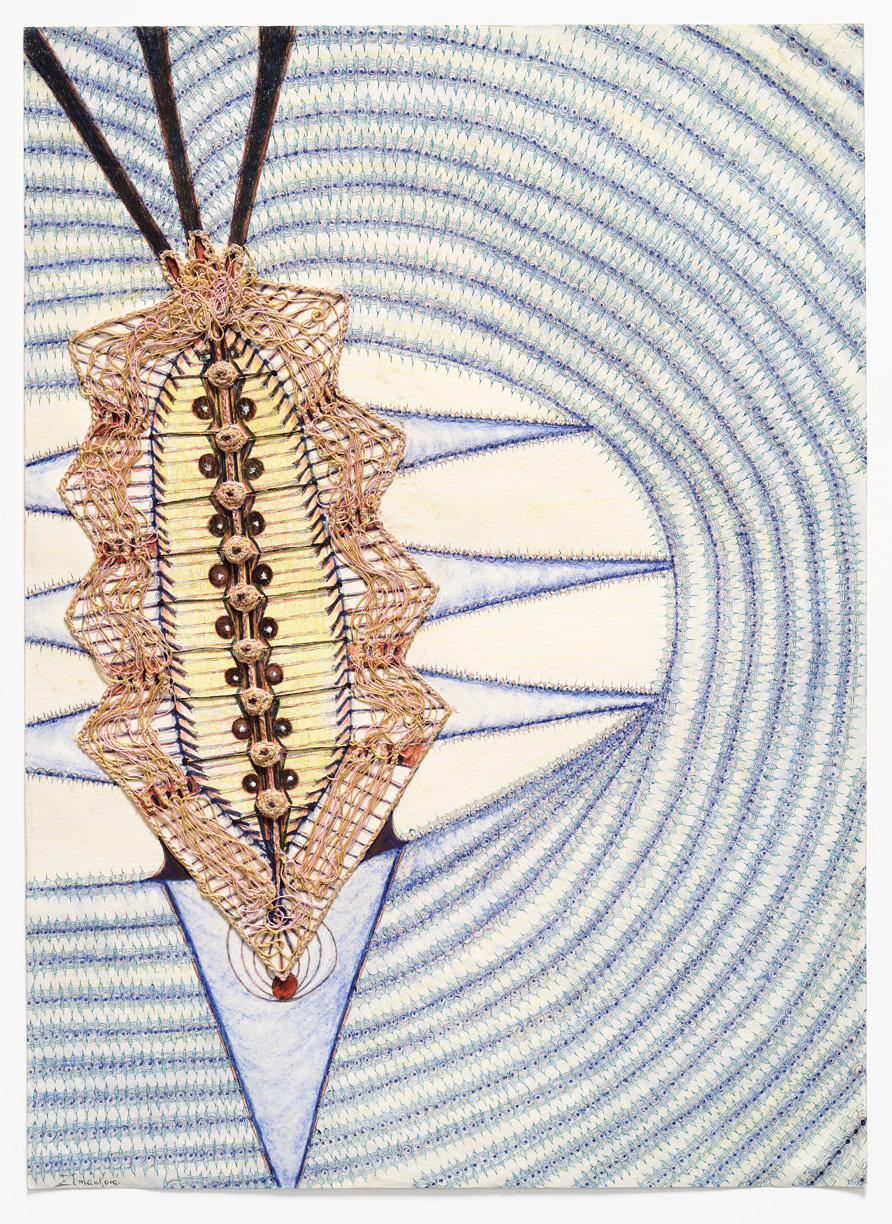
Anna Zemánková, No title, 1960s

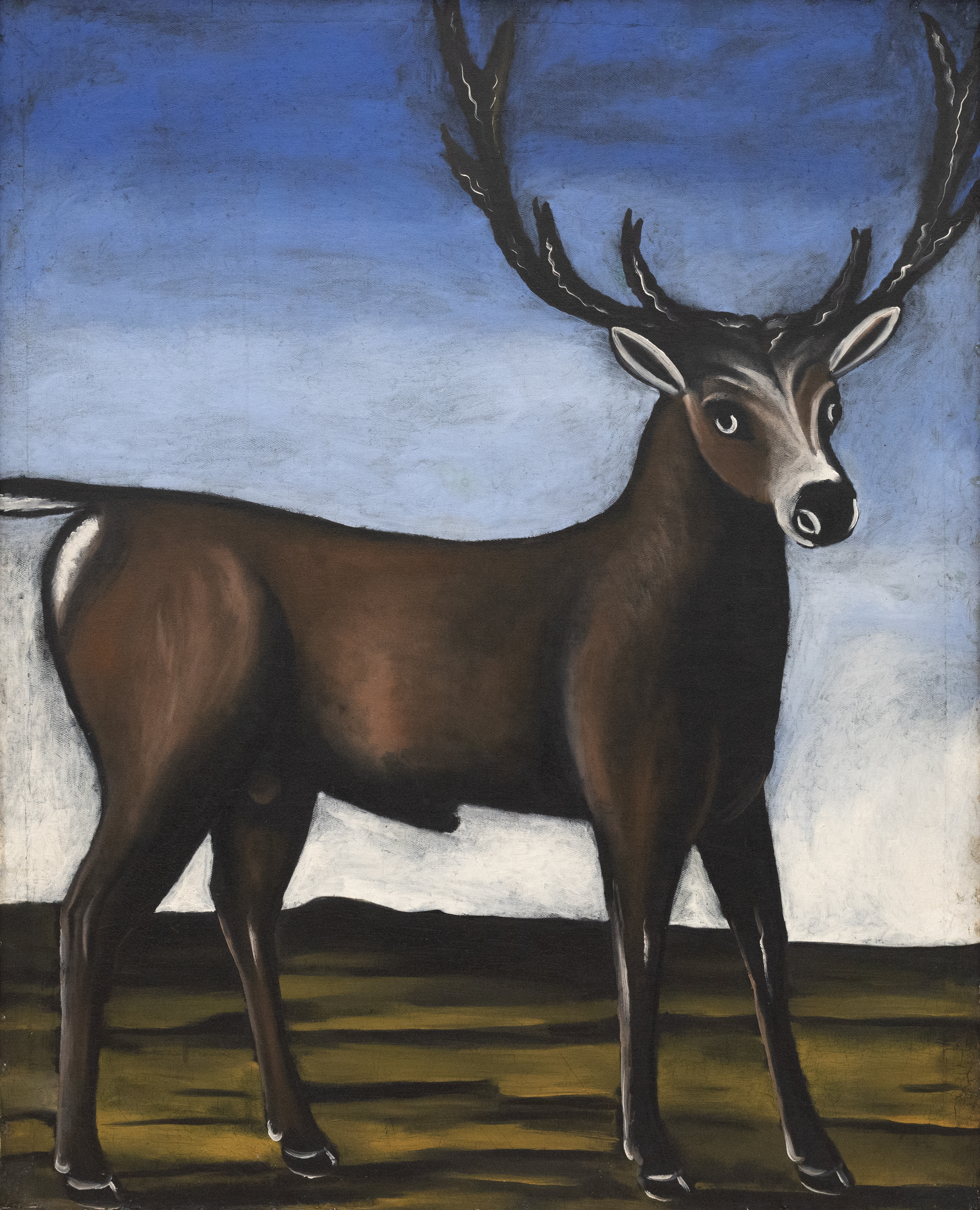
Niko Pirosmani, Deer, 1901

Outsider art is art made by self-taught individuals who are untrained and untutored in the traditional arts with typically little or no contact with the conventions of the "art world".

The term outsider art was coined in 1972 as the title of a book by art critic Roger Cardinal. It is an English equivalent for art brut (French: [aʁ bʁyt], "raw art" or "rough art"), a label created in the 1940s by French artist Jean Dubuffet to describe art created outside the boundaries of official culture. Dubuffet focused particularly on art by those on the outside of the established art scene, using as examples psychiatric hospital patients, hermits, and spiritualists.

Outsider art has emerged as a successful art marketing category: an annual Outsider Art Fair has taken place in New York since 1993, and there are at least two regularly published journals dedicated to the subject. The term is sometimes applied as a marketing label for art created by people who are outside the mainstream "art world" or "art gallery system", regardless of their circumstances or the content of their work. A more specific term, "outsider music", was later adapted for musicians.

== Art of the mentally ill ==
Interest in the art of the mentally ill, along with that of children and the makers of "peasant art", developed from the end of the 19th century onward, both by psychiatrists such as Cesare Lombroso, Auguste Marie or Marcel Réjà, and by artists, such as members of "Der Blaue Reiter" group: Wassily Kandinsky, August Macke, Franz Marc, Alexej von Jawlensky, and others.

What the artists perceived in the work of these groups was an expressive power born of their perceived lack of sophistication. Examples of this were reproduced in 1912 in the first and only issue of their publication, Der Blaue Reiter Almanac. During World War I, Macke was killed at Champagne in 1914 and Marc was killed at Verdun in 1916; the gap left by these deaths was to some extent filled by Paul Klee, who continued to draw inspiration from these 'primitives'.

Interest in the art of insane asylum inmates continued to grow in the 1920s. In 1921, Dr. Walter Morgenthaler published his book Ein Geisteskranker als Künstler (A Psychiatric Patient as Artist) about Adolf Wölfli, a psychotic mental patient in his care. Wölfli had spontaneously taken up drawing, and this activity seemed to calm him. His most outstanding work was an illustrated epic of 45 volumes in which he narrated his own imaginary life story. With 25,000 pages, 1,600 illustrations, and 1,500 collages, it is a monumental work. Wölfli also produced a large number of smaller works, some of which were sold or given as gifts. His work is on display at the Adolf Wölfli Foundation in the Museum of Fine Arts, Bern.

A defining moment was the publication of Bildnerei der Geisteskranken (Artistry of the Mentally Ill) in 1922, by Hans Prinzhorn. This was the first formal study of psychiatric works, based upon a compilation of thousands of examples from European institutions. The book and the art collection gained much attention from avant-garde artists of the time, including Paul Klee, Max Ernst, and Jean Dubuffet.

People with some formal artistic training as well as well-established artists are not immune from mental illness, and may also be institutionalized. For example, William Kurelek, later awarded the Order of Canada for his artistic life work, as a young man was admitted to the Maudsley Psychiatric Hospital where he was treated for schizophrenia. In the hospital he painted, producing The Maze, a dark depiction of his tortured youth. He was transferred from the Maudsley to Netherne Hospital from November 1953 to January 1955, to work with Edward Adamson (1911–1996), a pioneer of art therapy, and creator of the Adamson Collection.

== Jean Dubuffet and art brut ==
French artist Jean Dubuffet was particularly struck by Bildnerei der Geisteskranken and began his own collection of such art, which he called art brut or raw art. In 1948 he formed the Compagnie de l'Art Brut along with other artists, including André Breton and Claude Lévi-Strauss. The collection he established became known as the Collection de l'art brut and the curator was Slavko Kopač for almost three decades. It contains thousands of works and is now permanently housed in Lausanne, Switzerland.

Dubuffet characterized art brut as:

Those works created from solitude and from pure and authentic creative impulses – where the worries of competition, acclaim and social promotion do not interfere – are, because of these very facts, more precious than the productions of professionals. After a certain familiarity with these flourishings of an exalted feverishness, lived so fully and so intensely by their authors, we cannot avoid the feeling that in relation to these works, cultural art in its entirety appears to be the game of a futile society, a fallacious parade.

— Jean Dubuffet, "Place à l'incivisme" (December 1987 – February 1988).

Dubuffet argued that 'culture', that is mainstream culture, managed to assimilate every new development in art, and by doing so took away whatever power it might have had. The result was to asphyxiate genuine expression. Art brut was his solution to this problem – only art brut was immune to the influences of culture, immune to being absorbed and assimilated, because the artists themselves were not willing or able to be assimilated.

Dubuffet's championing of Art Brut would not last long. Scholars argue Dubuffet's distaste for the mainstream art world helped ensure that art brut and the Compagnie de l'Art Brut would not survive on a commercial basis. Dubuffet would kill art brut as he defined it in his quest for its authenticity. Three years after the Compagnie de l'Art Brut was formed, Dubuffet dissolved it, caving in to form the more conventional Collection de l'art brut afterward.

== Cultural context ==
The interest in "outsider" practices among twentieth-century artists and critics can be seen as part of a larger emphasis on the rejection of established values within the modernist art milieu. The early part of the 20th century gave rise to Cubism and the Dada, Constructivist, and Futurist movements in art, all of which involved a dramatic movement away from cultural forms of the past. Dadaist Marcel Duchamp, for example, abandoned "painterly" technique to allow chance operations a role in determining the form of his works, or simply to recontextualize existing "ready-made" objects as art. Mid-century artists, including Pablo Picasso, looked outside the traditions of high culture for inspiration, drawing from the artifacts of what they deemed "primitive" societies, the unschooled art made by children, and vulgar advertising graphics. Dubuffet's championing of the art brut – of the insane and others at the margins of society – is yet another example of avant-garde art challenging established cultural values. As with analysis of these other art movements, current discourse indicates art brut is innately tied to primitivism due to its similarity in its borrowing of personal "de-patriation" and exoticization of familiar yet alien forms.

== Terminology and criticism ==
A number of terms are used to describe art that is loosely understood as "outside" of official culture. Definitions of these terms vary and overlap. The editors of Raw Vision, a leading journal in the field, suggest that "Whatever views we have about the value of controversy itself, it is important to sustain creative discussion by way of an agreed vocabulary". Consequently, they lament the use of "outsider artist" to refer to almost any untrained artist. "It is not enough to be untrained, clumsy or naïve. Outsider Art is virtually synonymous with Art Brut in both spirit and meaning, to that rarity of art produced by those who do not know its name."

- Art Brut: Coined by Jean Dubuffet, the term translated literally from French means "raw art". 'Raw' is analogous in that it has not been through the academic 'cooking' process: i.e. the world of art schools, galleries, and museums. Dubuffet's original definition pertains strictly to the 'raw art' created by the autodidactic and shunned fringes of society.
- Folk art: Folk art originally suggested crafts and decorative skills associated with peasant communities in Europe – though presumably it could equally apply to any indigenous culture. It has broadened to include any product of practical craftsmanship and decorative skill – everything from chain-saw animals to hub-cap buildings. A key distinction between folk and outsider art is that folk art typically embodies traditional forms and social values, where outsider art stands in some marginal relationship to society's mainstream.
- Intuitive art/Visionary art: Raw Vision Magazine's preferred general terms for outsider art. It describes them as deliberate umbrella terms. However, visionary art, unlike other definitions here can often refer to the subject matter of the works, which includes images of a spiritual or religious nature. Intuitive art is probably the most general term available. Intuit Art Museum based in Chicago is dedicated to the study and exhibition of intuitive, self-taught and outsider art. The American Visionary Art Museum in Baltimore, Maryland is dedicated to the collection and display of visionary art.
- Marginal art/Art singulier: Essentially the same as Neuve Invention; refers to artists on the margins of the art world.
- Naïve art: Another term commonly applied to untrained artists who aspire to "normal" artistic status, i.e. they have a much more conscious interaction with the mainstream art world than do outsider artists.
- Neuve invention: Used to describe artists who, although marginal, have some interaction with mainstream culture. They may be doing art part-time for instance. The expression was coined by Dubuffet too; strictly speaking, it refers only to a special part of the Collection de l'art brut.
- Visionary environments: Buildings and sculpture parks built by visionary artists – ranging from decorated houses to large areas incorporating a large number of individual sculptures with a tightly associated theme. Examples include Watts Towers by Simon Rodia, Buddha Park and Sala Keoku by Bunleua Sulilat, and The Palais idéal by Ferdinand Cheval.

In recent years, an increasingly critical view has developed of the different, often discriminatory terms and the separation of non-academic and academic art. According to art historian and curator Susanne Pfeffer, being an artist is not a choice but a destiny; only one's background, gender or class determines whether someone can study art and thus be socially recognized as an artist. Art that therefore does not take place within the recognized system is usually rejected by this system. Due to the system's power of definition, which always lies with the system and not with the artists themselves, exclusionary terms are used that are never intended to be inclusive.

The art critic Jerry Saltz advocates abolishing the separation between "outsider art" and institutionalized, official art and including non-academic art in the presentation of permanent collections in major museums. He calls for artists such as Hilma af Klint, Bill Traylor, Adolf Wölfli and John Kane to be canonized, as their discrimination tells a false and untruthful story of art history.

Roberta Smith, art critic for the New York Times, also advocates a dissolution of the separation of non-academic and academic art and calls for museums to integrate non-academic art equally into their collection presentations. Smith points to the outstanding artistic quality of works by self-taught artists, which require a rewriting of the 20th-century art canon.

In 2023 and 2024, the Sprengel Museum Hannover and the Kunstsammlungen Chemnitz presented the exhibition Which Modernism? In- and Outsiders of the Avant-Garde, with the intention of correcting the view of "naive" artists as "outsiders" and demonstrating their close links to the avant-garde. The exhibition described "naive art" as a part of modernism and a stylistic phenomenon of equal status. "Naïve" artists followed their own style, influencing other artists and being influenced by other artists.

== See also ==
- Absurdism – Theory that life is meaningless
- Avant-garde – Works that are experimental or innovative
- Asemic writing – Wordless open semantic form of writing
- Automatic writing – Claimed psychic ability
- Category: Outsider artists
- Collection de l'art brut – Outsider art museum in Lausanne, Switzerland
- Art collection of David Bowie – Private collection of artworks
  - Outside (David Bowie album) – 1995 studio album by David Bowie
- Exoticism – Trend in art and design
- Heta-uma – Japanese manga movement
- Horror vacui – Latin phrase which means "fear of empty space"
- Kitsch – Art or other objects that appeal to popular rather than high art tastes
- Lille Métropole Museum of Modern, Contemporary and Outsider Art – Art Museum in Villeneuve d'Ascq, France
- Lowbrow (art movement) – Underground visual art movement
- Outsider music – Music genre
- Psychedelic art – Visual art inspired by psychedelic experiences
- Saving and Preserving Arts and Cultural Environments – Non-profit public benefit organization with an international focus
- Surrealism – International cultural movement (1920s–1950s)
- Syncretism – Combination of distinct beliefs or schools of thought
- Vernacular architecture – Architecture based on local needs, materials, traditions
- World music – Non-Western traditional music
