= Folk Art Society of America =

U.S. non-profit organization

The Folk Art Society of America is a 501(c)(3) organization, founded in 1987 "to advocate the discovery, study, documentation, preservation and exhibition of folk art, folk artists and folk art environments, with an emphasis on the contemporary". The society publishes a journal, the Folk Art Messenger three times a year, and holds an annual conference that includes a symposium with speakers as well as visits to folk art museums and private art collections. Members of the organization include artists, collectors, academics, and curators, as well as libraries and other arts organizations.

== History ==
Ann and William Oppenhimer are considered the founders of the Folk Art Society of America and currently serve as the Executive Director and CFO respectively. Previously William served as the Chairman of the Executive Committee and Ann was the president of the organization. Before devoting her time to the Folk Art Society, Ann served on the art history faculty at the University of Richmond. As a member of the faculty she curated an exhibition of work from the acclaimed folk artist Howard Finster. The Oppenhimer's also have a significant folk art collection of their own, and their personal and professional interest served as a launch pad for activities of the society itself. Due to their initiative the society has, since its founding, produced its publication and held a conference every year. The regular publication of This Magazine, as well as the maintenance of an updated website has led Ann Oppenhimer and the Folk Art Society to win numerous awards from the Virginia Professional Communicators.

== Annual conference ==
In 2017, the Folk Art Society of America celebrated its 30th conference. The conference was open to all who register and included a symposium, a benefit art auction, studio tours, home tours, and museum visits. Local museums usually plan an exhibition to coincide with the occurrence of the Society's conference. At the conference, the Society grants its annual Awards of Distinction, which are given to artists and scholars of folk art. A scholarship to attend the conference is given to a graduate student of folk art. In honor of one of the pioneers of folk art collecting, Herbert Hemphill Jr., a work of folk art is gifted to a museum or university, typically in the area the conference is being held. There is an annual auction that occurs at the conference to which members and folk artists submit artwork.

=== Past locations ===
- Richmond 1988
- Waverly (Va.) 1989
- Washington 1990
- Chicago 1991
- Los Angeles 1992
- New Orleans 1993
- Santa Fe 1994
- Atlanta 1995
- Birmingham 1996
- Milwaukee 1997
- Houston 1998
- Lexington/Morehead 1999
- San Diego 2000
- Richmond 2001
- Savannah 2002
- St. Louis 2003
- Oakland 2004
- Chicago 2005
- Phoenix 2006
- Louisville 2007
- Washington 2008
- St. Petersburg, Fla. 2009
- Santa Fe 2010
- Richmond 2011
- Atlanta 2012
- Raleigh 2013
- Columbus 2014
- Memphis 2015
- St. Petersburg, Florida 2016
- Santa Fe 2017
- Oaxaca, Mexico 2018
- Nova Scotia 2019
- Charleston, SC 2022

== Folk Art Messenger ==
The Folk Art Messenger is a journal that includes a variety of articles from writers on topics important to the folk art and self-taught art world including articles about folk artists, auctions, exhibitions, fairs, collectors and book reviews, as well as artists' obituaries. The magazine is known for its inclusive approach, focusing on the artists' struggles and successes, rather than hotly debated issues like what to call this type of art. Originally, the first Messenger was a black-and-white, 6-page fold out, but began to be published in color in 1997 with the 38th issue. Currently, the 40-page magazine carries no advertising and is the only American publication of its type published three time a year. The European counterpart to the Messenger, titled Raw Vision, was first published in 1989. While the Folk Art Messenger focuses mainly on American artists, the two have much in common and previously referenced each other.

== Folk art environments ==
A folk art environment is a large-scale work of art created by a folk or self-taught artist. These works are identified and recorded by Saving and Preserving Arts and Cultural Environments, a non profit arts organization. The Folk Art Society has awarded 12 plaques of recognition to various folk art environments. The plaque from FASA identifies the site as worthy of preservation and protection. Recipients of this plaque include the Watts Towers, Howard Finster's Paradise Garden, the Miles B. Carpenter Museum, and Grandma Prisbrey's Bottle Village.

Bottle Village, located in Simi Valley, Calif. was created by folk artist Tressa Prisbrey beginning in 1956. Following her death in 1988, the future of the village was uncertain. Many residents of the area found the site to be garish and wanted it demolished, however recognition from the Folk Art Society of America as well as the state's historic landmark program prevented its destruction after it was damaged in the Simi Valley earthquake in 1994.

== Location ==
The Folk Art Society was founded in Richmond, Virginia, and held its first conference in the city as well. Although the organization strives to span the nation and now holds conferences throughout the US, the headquarters remain in Richmond since the founding except for a brief interlude. In 2014, the Society became a part of Longwood University, renamed the Folk Art Society of America at Longwood Center for the Visual Arts or FASA@LCVA. The FASA office and archives were moved to Farmville, Virginia, for two years as a part of this transition. However this relationship was later discontinued and the Society returned to Richmond in March 2016. Currently the Society is in the process of turning its archives over to the Virginia Historical Society in Richmond, and will be working with Lee Shepard, the Vice President for Collections, in order to create a permanent archive that will be digitized and available for scholarly research.
