= Meisl =

Meisl is a surname. Notable persons with that name include:

- Karl Meisl (1775–1853), Austrian dramatist
- Hugo Meisl (1881–1937), Austrian football coach and referee
- Willy Meisl (1895–1968), Austrian sports journalist, brother of Hugo Meisl
- Luca Meisl (born 1999), Austrian footballer
- Matteo Meisl (born 2000), Austrian footballer
