= John Maizels =

John Maizels is the founder of Raw Vision magazine which he created in London in 1989 as a forum for the work of self-taught artists, or unknown geniuses, which he felt was overlooked and under-appreciated. Initially published biannually, Raw Vision is now published quarterly.

Educated at Latymer Upper School, Hammersmith in the early 1960s, and a former student of the Chelsea School of Art, Maizels worked as an artist for several years before going on to teach art himself. He first discovered outsider art through Roger Cardinal's book of the same name in 1972 and organised many visits to sites and collections in Europe before founding Raw Vision magazine.

Raw Vision was presented with an award from UNESCO for being the ‘World's Best Art Magazine’ in 1998. In over 30 years of publishing it has presented hundreds of previously little known outsider and self-taught artists from around the world. Its 100th edition was published in 2019.

Maizels is the author of several art books including "Fantasy Worlds" with photographer Deidi Von Schaewen, a large survey of visionary environments around the world, 'Raw Creation: Outsider Art and Beyond', and 'Raw Erotica' which he has most recently been working on with Roger Cardinal and Colin Rhodes. Maizels also contributed to Vernacular Visionaries: International Outsider Art with an essay on Nek Chand's Rock Garden of Chandigarh, India, for which he helps to run a volunteer programme, describing the visionary artist's garden as the nearest one can get to an earthly paradise.

Newspaper articles have included Nek Chand's obituary in the Guardian (June 15, 2015) and ‘Why there's more to ‘outsider art’ than mental illness’ in the Daily Telegraph (Dec 30 2021).

Maizels with his wife Maggie curated ‘Love: Error and Eros’ at the American Visionary Art Museum in Baltimore in 1998. Other curations have included ‘Equal Rights in Creativity’ at the Mexico Gallery in London in 2004, part of a continent wide programme across the EU to present self-taught and outsider art.

Maizels’ largest exhibition was a celebration of 25 years of Raw Vision with a large international outsider art survey exhibition at Halle Saint Pierre, Paris, presenting over 200 works from both sides of the Atlantic, most of which had never been exhibited together before.
