= Saving and Preserving Arts and Cultural Environments =

Non-profit public benefit organization with an international focus

Saving and Preserving Arts and Cultural Environments (SPACES or SPACES Archives) is a non-profit public benefit organization created with an international focus on the study, documentation, and preservation of art environments (or visionary environments) and self-taught, publicly-accessible artistic activity (see self-taught art). Currently based in Aptos, California, SPACES boasts an archive of approximately 35,000 photographs as well as hundreds of books, articles, audio and video tapes/DVDs, and artists’ documents. SPACES has become recognized internationally as the largest and most complete archive on this subject.

SPACES maintains an online index of more than 1,400 art environments around the world, exhibiting its collection of images, documents, and writings, and also providing further reading on the artists and their built environments. The organization also provides resources and best practices on the preservation of threatened sites.

In June 2017, SPACES announced a partnership with the Kohler Foundation to transfer SPACES’ archives and the operation of the website to the only foundation in the country dedicated to the preservation of art environments. The Kohler Foundation, which is the philanthropic organization founded by the Kohler family of Wisconsin, has committed extensive resources to the present and future of SPACES' mission and archives for "generations to come."

== History ==
SPACES was organized in 1969 and then formally incorporated in 1978 by Founding Director Seymour Rosen, a Los Angeles photographer who became interested in the aesthetic genre of art environments after photographing Watts Towers. His images of this iconic artwork – including those of the infamous 1959 "stress-test" that proved the Towers’ stability – resulted in Rosen's first major solo photographic exhibition at the Los Angeles County Museum of Art in 1962, titled Simon Rodia's Towers in Watts. Rosen also authored the 1979 book In Celebration of Ourselves.

As the founder of the SPACES organization, Rosen was invited to serve on the board of directors of Raw Vision with its inception, and from its first issue in 1989 contributed often to its pages. In 1992 he was honored by the Folk Art Society of America with their Award of Distinction for his “pioneering work in the field of environmental documentation and preservation.”. This included advocacy such as successfully designating sites for the California State Landmark registry, including Grandma Prisbrey's Bottle Village in Simi Valley and Nitt Witt Ridge in Cambria.

[These sites] defy categorization, and that fact has resulted in an ongoing battle to get institutions to recognize the value of documenting and preserving these forms of expression. Collecting the material has been, of necessity, a labor of love…. But I am told that perhaps the time has come; perhaps a varied and complete record of the most ephemeral events of the American spirit and heritage can finally be assembled for us all to share. Maybe we will even be able to preserve the environments and objects so that people can see them firsthand. SPACES is an attempt to move in that direction, to acknowledge the magic made available to us by those whose work looks best outside of institutional walls—with the hope that we all will take the time to do our own explorations.

— Seymour Rosen, founder of SPACES, 1978

After Rosen died in 2006, Jo Farb Hernández, a folklorist, curator, and writer, became the second Executive Director of SPACES.

== The archive and collection ==
The databases are generally organized into four components:

- The site database, which contains historically-significant and varied information on over 1,400 sites in the United States alone, as well as on numerous sites overseas;
- The bibliographic database, which includes almost 2,000 multi-lingual entries relating to art environments;
- The exhibitions and events database, a comprehensive chronological record of thousands of museum/gallery displays, conferences, lectures, panels, and other events which featured these artists and their sites, including documented audience figures for each; and, most importantly,
- The archival collection, including some 35,000 photographs, site plans, and primary documents produced by the artists, maps, artifacts, video and audio cassettes and DVDs of artist interviews, and other materials related to self-taught artistic activities. This also includes a clipping file, personal letters and correspondence from artists, scholars, researchers, museum and gallery personnel, arts and history/humanities councils, and governmental agencies.

SPACES actively collects photographs and documentation related to art environments around the world, and encourages submissions and donations from the public.
