= Salvation Mountain =

California hillside visionary environment

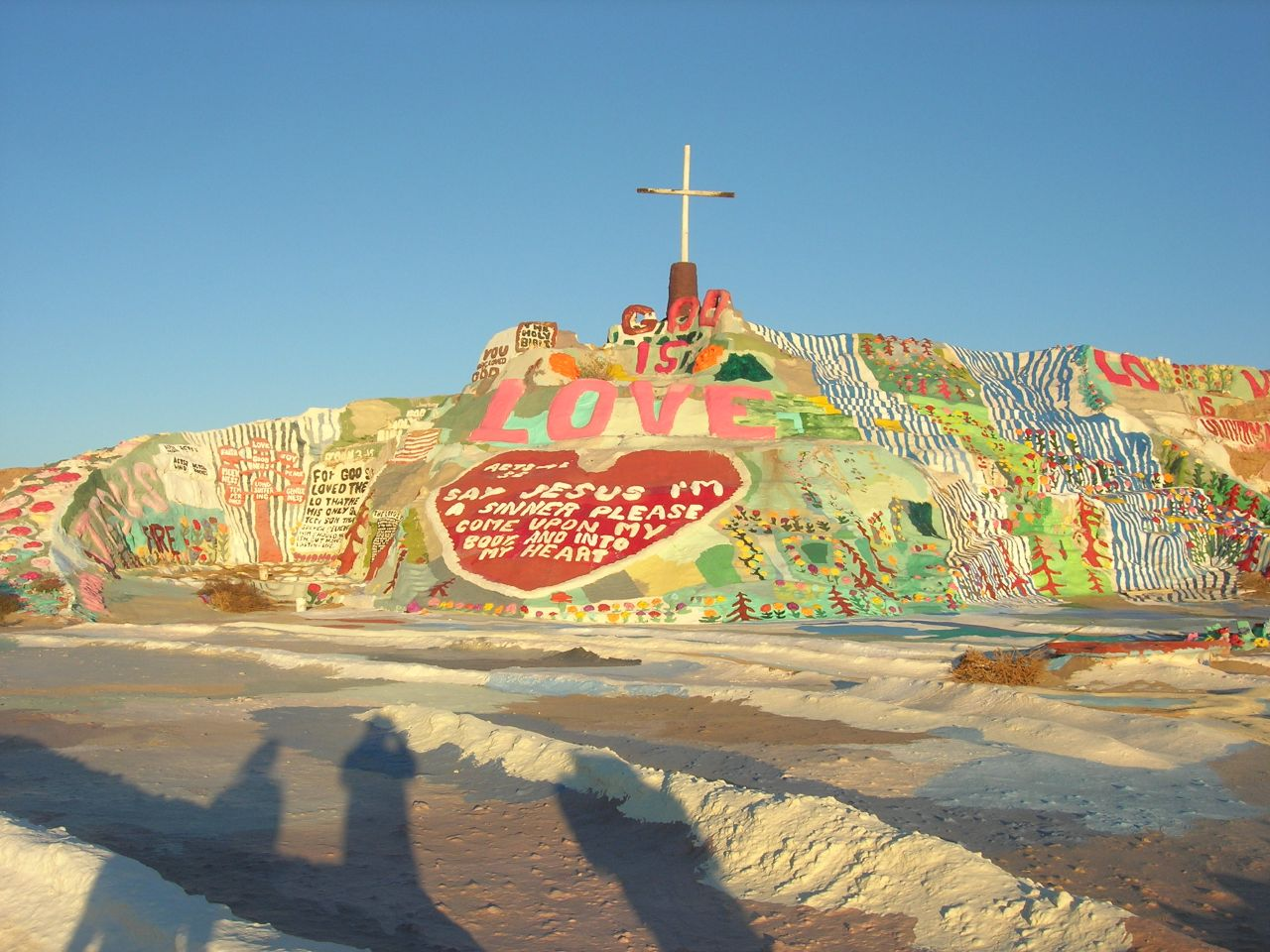
- 2008 photo
- Artist: Leonard Knight
- Year: 1984–2011
- Completion date: Ongoing (maintained by volunteers)
- Medium: Adobe, paint, discarded materials
- Subject: Christian religious art
- Dimensions: 130 cm (50 in); 100 yards (91 m) wide
- Designation: Folk Art Society of America recognized site
- Condition: Maintained by volunteers
- Location: Niland, California; 33°15′15″N 115°28′21″W
- Owner: Maintained by Salvation Mountain, Inc.
- Website: salvationmountain.org

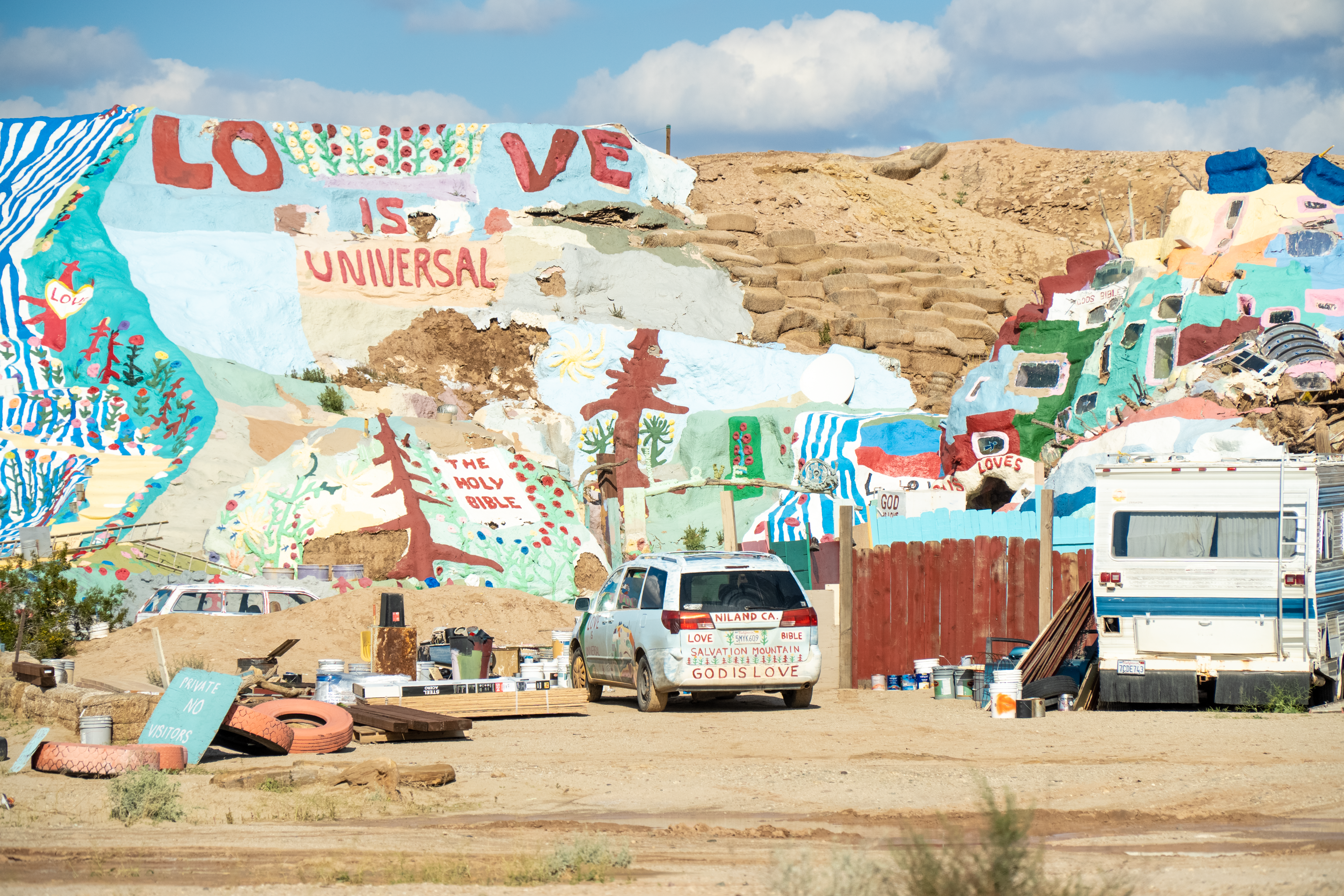
Salvation Mountain at the LOVE IS UNIVERSAL area; 2008 photo

Salvation Mountain is a hillside visionary environment created by artist Leonard Knight (1931–2014) in the California Desert area of Imperial County, north of Calipatria, northeast of Niland, near the Slab City community, and several miles from the Salton Sea.

The artwork is made of adobe bricks, discarded tires and windows, automobile parts and thousands of gallons of paint. It encompasses numerous murals and areas painted with Christian sayings and Bible verses, though its philosophy was built around the Sinner's prayer.

The Folk Art Society of America declared it "a folk art site worthy of preservation and protection" in the year 2000. In an address to the United States Congress on May 15, 2002, California Senator Barbara Boxer described it as "a unique and visionary sculpture... a national treasure... profoundly strange and beautifully accessible, and worthy of the international acclaim it receives".

In December 2011, the 80-year-old Knight was placed in a long-term care facility in El Cajon for dementia. He died on February 10, 2014, in El Cajon. He was able to visit Salvation Mountain for the last time in May 2013; the visit was recorded by KPBS (TV).

Concern was raised in 2012 for the future of the site, which requires constant upkeep due to the harsh desert environment. Many visitors were donating paint to the project, and a group of volunteers worked to protect and maintain the site. In February 2011, a public charity, Salvation Mountain, Inc. was established to support the project. In 2013, the Annenberg Foundation donated $32,000 to Salvation Mountain Inc. for materials and equipment to "improve security and strengthen operations". A 2014 article stated that Salvation Mountain Inc. was operated by the nine volunteer members of its board.

== Formation ==
Knight was born on November 1, 1931, outside Burlington, Vermont, and had served in the Korean War. In the 1970s, Knight painted "GOD IS LOVE" on a hot air balloon that he built out of patchwork materials and a stove. When it failed to fly, Knight prayed and felt that God's response was that he should build a mountain. By 1984, Knight had discovered Slab City – a transient and retiree commune – and decided to leave a 'small monument' out of concrete and paint. Over five years, the project grew.

The current Salvation Mountain is actually the second construction to occupy the site; Knight began the first Salvation Mountain in 1984. A rainstorm caused a crack in 1989 which caused it to collapse. Knight was not discouraged; he rather saw it as God's way of letting him know the Mountain was not safe. He began work on the current Salvation Mountain "with more smarts" – such as better materials and engineering, including adobe mixed with straw. After completion, the "mountain" was several stories high and was about a hundred yards wide.

In 1998, Knight wanted to expand the mountain. He gathered ideas from the Navajo who settled in the area around Salvation Mountain. Their pueblitos inspired Knight and he then began forming the Hogan. It is a dome-like structure made of adobe and straw that insulates from heat. Knight intended to live in it, though he always preferred to live in a shack on the back of his truck, and did so for 27 years. For a long period, he had help with the project from a friend, Bill Ammon ("Builder Bill"), of Slab City.

Knight was known for providing free tours to visitors at Salvation Mountain. According to one account, he was described as a "visionary American folk artist" whose message was "unconditional love to humankind". The same source noted that Knight "arrived accidentally ... [but] immediately recognized an opportunity to continue his large-scale gospel message. He made a mountain with his bare hands. Leonard built Salvation Mountain".

== Later years ==
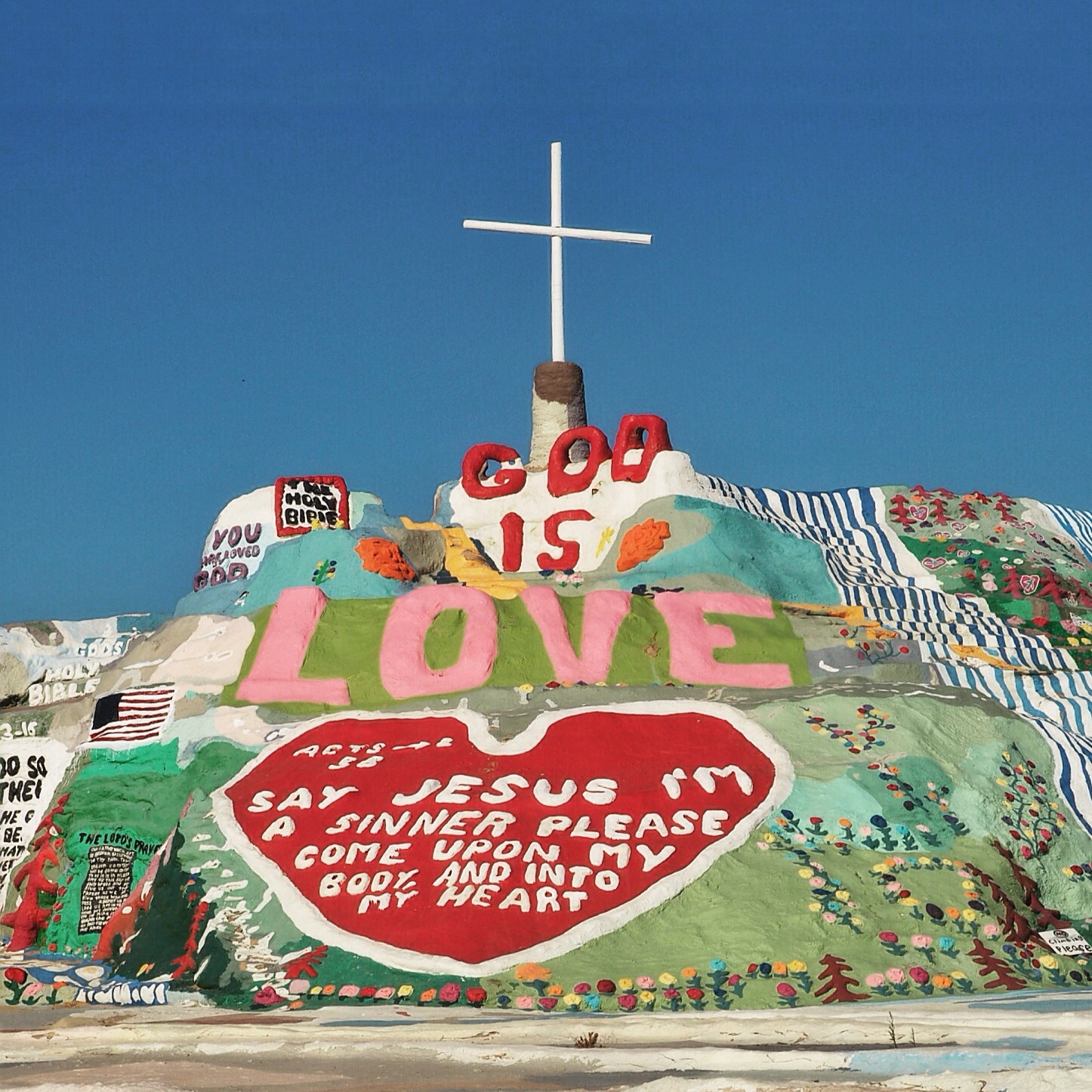
Salvation Mountain – God is Love; 2015 photo

Knight also began another formation, what he liked to call "the museum". It is modeled after the semi-inflated hot air balloon Knight tried to create before Salvation Mountain; the balloon is now on view at the American Visionary Art Museum. The museum is a semi-dome structure in the mountain that contains several small items given to him by friends and visitors. Each item has a significance and, more often than not, visitors seek out Salvation Mountain to pray and leave an item at the mountain as symbolism of giving themselves to God. The museum is held up by adobe and straw, but also by car parts and a tangle of trees that twist within the dome and reach through the top.

Over the last ten years of his life, Knight planned to repaint the mountain twice a year to ensure that the paint layer would be very thick. He was unable to continue this because of an injury sustained in 2011. Afterwards, a public charity, Salvation Mountain, Inc., was established to continue this maintenance, and as of 2020, still operates.

Leonard Knight was featured in Sean Penn's film Into the Wild, released in 2007. Knight died in 2014. According to his obituary, he "spent almost 30 years building the colorful mountain in the Imperial Valley desert, just outside of Niland, Calif. Built out of adobe and donated paint, Knight worked on the mountain all day, every day. He even slept at the mountain's base in the back of a pick-up truck, with no electricity or running water. He bathed in the nearby natural hot springs."

A National Geographic article published after Knight's death provided this insight into the creator of Salvation Mountain.

"A visionary ... Leonard worked beyond our concept of time, slowly and methodically without ever wandering from his path. His sole purpose in this endeavor was to spread the message that 'God is Love'. He shared this with everyone who came to the mountain ..."

The work still stands as a 50 ft-tall piece of religious folk art, and for Slab City, "an unofficial centrepiece for the community and [cementing] the area's anarchic creative identity", according to a 2020 report.

== Paint toxicity concerns ==
In July 1994, Imperial County hired a toxic waste specialist to test the soils around Salvation Mountain, with results showing high levels of lead toxicity. Knight and his supporters gathered signatures for a second test to be done by an independent party of his choosing. That test came back negative, supporting Knight's claim that he used non-toxic paints and that there were no toxins in the soil. However, Knight's claim of using latex paint is still concerning. The Pollution Prevention Regional Information Center cites latex paint as, "Highly toxic to the environment. It harms fish and wildlife, and contaminates the food chain if poured down a storm drain. It can also pollute groundwater if dumped on the ground."

== Media appearances ==
- Huell Howser did two interviews ten years apart for his series California's Gold. In the second interview, he described the changes made since the first interview.
- British rock band Coldplay filmed the music video for their song "Birds" (from their 2015 album A Head Full of Dreams) on the hill.
- The music video for the American singer, songwriter, and rapper Kesha's song "Praying" was partially filmed on Salvation Mountain.
- Leonard Knight: A Man & His Mountain – 2015 documentary film directed by Andrew Blake Doyle.
- Former Girls' Generation member Jessica Jung filmed the music video for her solo debut "Fly" at Salvation Mountain
