= Maisel =

Maisel (/ˈmeɪzəl/) is a surname. Like the related Meisel, this surname has two main derivations, 1) from Yiddish mayzel 'little mouse,' especially in/from Southern Germany, and 2) Middle German meizel, meisel 'chisel,' a metonymic name for a woodcarver, stone mason, or surgeon; compare Modern Standard German Meißel. Families with the latter meaning can be German Jews, Catholics, or Protestants. Notable people with the surname include:

- Alan Maisel (born 1946), American politician
- Charlie Maisel (1894–1953), American baseball player
- David Maisel, American film and stage producer
- David Maisel (visual artist) (born 1961), American photographer and visual artist
- Edward Maisel (1917–2008), American writer
- Eric Maisel (born 1947), American psychotherapist and author
- Ernst Maisel (1896–1978), German Wehrmacht general
- Fritz Maisel (1889–1967), American baseball player
- George Maisel (1892–1968), American baseball player
- Herbert Maisel (1930–2019), American blackjack strategy pioneer
- Ileen Maisel (1955–2024), American-born British film producer
- Ivan Maisel, American sports writer
- Jay Maisel (born 1931), American photographer
- L. Sandy Maisel (1945–2024), American political scientist
- Sherman J. Maisel (1918–2010), American economist
- Evelyn Maisel Witkin (1921–2023), American bacterial geneticist

== See also ==
- Meisel
- Brauerei Gebr. Maisel, German brewery
- Maisel Brau Bamberg, defunct German brewery
- Maisel European Gallery Collection, see Mobile Museum of Art
- Maisel Oil Company, defunct Scottish company
- Maisel Synagogue, Czech Jewish congregation
- Maisel's Indian Trading Post, Albuquerque, New Mexico
- Israel A. Maisels (1905–1994), South African lawyer and judge
- The Marvelous Mrs. Maisel, American television program
