= Robert A. Hall Jr. =

American linguist (1911–1997)

- Born: Robert Anderson Hall Jr. April 4, 1911; Raleigh, North Carolina, U.S.
- Died: December 2, 1997 (aged 86); Ithaca, New York, U.S.
- Spouses: Frances L. Adkins (m. 1936; died 1975); Alice M. Colby-Hall
- Children: 3

Academic background
- Education: Princeton University (BA); University of Chicago (MA); University of Rome (DLitt)

Academic work
- Discipline: Linguist
- Institutions: Cornell University (1946–1975)
- Main interests: Romance languages; Pidgin and creole languages

Robert Anderson Hall Jr. (April 4, 1911 – December 2, 1997) was an American linguist who specialized in Romance languages.

== Early life ==
Hall was born in Raleigh, North Carolina, on April 4, 1911. Most of his childhood was spent in Minnesota and New England.

He received his BA from Princeton in 1931, having majored in French and German literature. He then began an MA at the University of Chicago, where he studied linguistics with Harry Hoijer and Leonard Bloomfield and classical Indo-European languages (Greek, Latin, Sanskrit, Avestan, and Old Persian) with Carl Darling Buck and George Bobrinskoy.

He took a break from his graduate studies at Chicago in order to travel to Italy to study Italian literature and historical linguistics, which led to his receiving a DLitt from the University of Rome in 1934.

Upon returning to United States, he completed the remaining requirements for his MA, which was awarded in 1935. As he had already received a DLitt from the University of Rome, he chose not to pursue a PhD at Chicago.

== Career ==
Hall began his academic career at the University of Puerto Rico in 1936, and then moved to Princeton in 1939 and Brown in 1940.

In 1943, he went to work at U.S. Armed Forces Institute (USAFI) in Washington, where he helped to produce textbooks for French, Italian, Spanish, and Portuguese as part of the "Spoken Language" series. This series was to have a significant effect on the teaching of foreign languages in the United States. He also contributed to the Armed Services Training Program (ASTP).

At the invitation of J Milton Cowan, Hall joined the faculty at Cornell in 1946 and helped to found the Division of Modern Languages there. When he retired in 1975, he received the title of Professor Emeritus of Linguistics and Italian.

In addition to the Romance languages, he had a strong interest in pidgin and creole languages. He also took an interest in the controversial Kensington Runestone, which he believed to be genuine.

Hall was a critic of the theories of Noam Chomsky.

== Personal life ==
In 1936, Hall married Frances L. Adkins, with whom he had three children (one son and two daughters). After Adkins's death in 1975, Hall married Alice M. Colby-Hall.

A fan of P. G. Wodehouse, Hall wrote a book on Wodehouse's comic style and served as the president of the Wodehouse Society from 1983 to 1985.

He died from Parkinson's disease at the Cayuga Medical Center in Ithaca, New York, on December 2, 1997, at the age of 86.

== Notable works ==
- An Analytical Grammar of the Hungarian Language. 1938. JSTOR 522006.
- Melanesian Pidgin English: Grammar, Texts, Vocabulary. 1943. OCLC 1043569.
- Descriptive Italian Grammar. 1948. OCLC 977282097.
- Leave Your Language Alone!. 1950. LCCN 50--624. OCLC 239479.
- A Short History of Italian Literature. 1951. OCLC 987961846.
- Haitian Creole: Grammar, Texts, Vocabulary. 1953.
- Hands Off Pidgin English!. 1955. LCCN 55--372. OCLC 1358173.
- Italian for Modern Living. 1959. OCLC 2232488.
- Linguistics and Your Language. 1960. OCLC 2360235.
- Sound and Spelling in English. 1961.
- Idealism in Romance Linguistics. 1963. LCCN 63--1526. OCLC 312739.
- Introductory Linguistics. 1964. LCCN 64--2108. OCLC 306648.
- New Ways to Learn a Foreign Language. 1966. ISBN 0-87950-293-2.
- Pidgin and Creole Languages. 1966. ISBN 0-8014-0173-9.
- An Essay on Language. 1968.
- La struttura dell'italiano. 1971. LCCN 76--58802. OCLC 535033.
- External History of the Romance Languages. 1974. ISBN 0-444-00136-0.
- The Comic Style of P. G. Wodehouse. 1974. ISBN 0-208-01409-8.
- Stormy Petrel in Linguistics. 1975. ISBN 0-87950-390-4.
- American Linguistics, 1925–1969: Three Essays. 1976. ISBN 3-534-06226-4.
- Proto-Romance Phonology. 1976. ISBN 0-444-00183-2.
- Antonio Fogazzaro. 1978. ISBN 0-8057-6311-2.
- Language, Literature, and Life: Selected Essays. 1978. ISBN 0-933104-07-3.
- The Kensington Rune-Stone is Genuine: Linguistic, Practical, Methodological Considerations. 1982. ISBN 0-917496-20-5.
- Linguistics and Pseudo-Linguistics: Selected Essays, 1965–1985. 1987. ISBN 90-272-3549-X.
- A Life for Language: A Biographical Memoir of Leonard Bloomfield. 1990. ISBN 1-55619-350-5.
- The Kensington Rune-Stone, Authentic and Important: A Critical Edition. 1994. ISBN 0-933104-30-8.
