= Jurgen M. Meisel =

Professor

Jürgen M. Meisel is a retired Professor of French, Portuguese and Spanish at the University of Hamburg. He has researched into first and second language acquisition, multilingualism, and grammatical theory. Meisel is also one of the four chief editors of Bilingualism: Language and Cognition, Cambridge University Press.

== Selected publications ==
- Meisel, Jürgen M. (ed) (1994) Bilingual first language acquisition: French and German grammatical development, John Benjamins Publishing Company
- Meisel, Jürgen M. (ed) (2011) First and Second Language Acquisition: Parallels and Differences, Series: Cambridge Textbooks in Linguistics
