= Raw Vision =

British journal devoted to outsider art

Raw Vision is a British journal devoted to outsider art and edited by John Maizels. It features content about the subject worldwide. Raw Vision celebrates the art of “unknown geniuses” who are untrained, unschooled and uninfluenced by the art world. As well as featuring self-taught and visionary artists, both well-known and newly discovered, the journal also features visionary environments, sculpture gardens, self-built architecture and unique buildings.

Issue 79 (Summer 2013) of Raw Vision magazine. Cover image: Alex Grey.

== History ==
Raw Vision was founded by John Maizels in 1989 as a way of telling people about outsider art, with a small freelance staff and text contributed by scholars. Each issue features outsider artists from different countries, as well as covering general news on the subject of outsider art from around the world.

Raw Vision has been described as "outsider art's Rolling Stone", and in 2007 was cited as the only publication devoted exclusively to this art form. Over the years, it has featured several hundred self-taught and visionary artists, many of whom were completely unknown. It also features visionary environments—sculpture gardens, self built architecture and unique buildings.

It defines outsider art as "creative expression that exist outside accepted cultural norms, or the realm of 'fine art'", and says that its "creators would not consider themselves artists, nor would they even feel that they were producing art at all."

When I came across [outsider art] I was just so amazed by it, it was so powerful and it had such strong personal meaning... people are revealing themselves, their demons, their own aspirations, their own inner feelings ... They don't go to exhibitions or private views, they just work. They've got an inner compulsion.

— John Maizels, founder of Raw Vision

== See also ==
- Saving and Preserving Arts and Cultural Environments
