= Female cosmetic coalitions =

Model in evolutionary anthropology

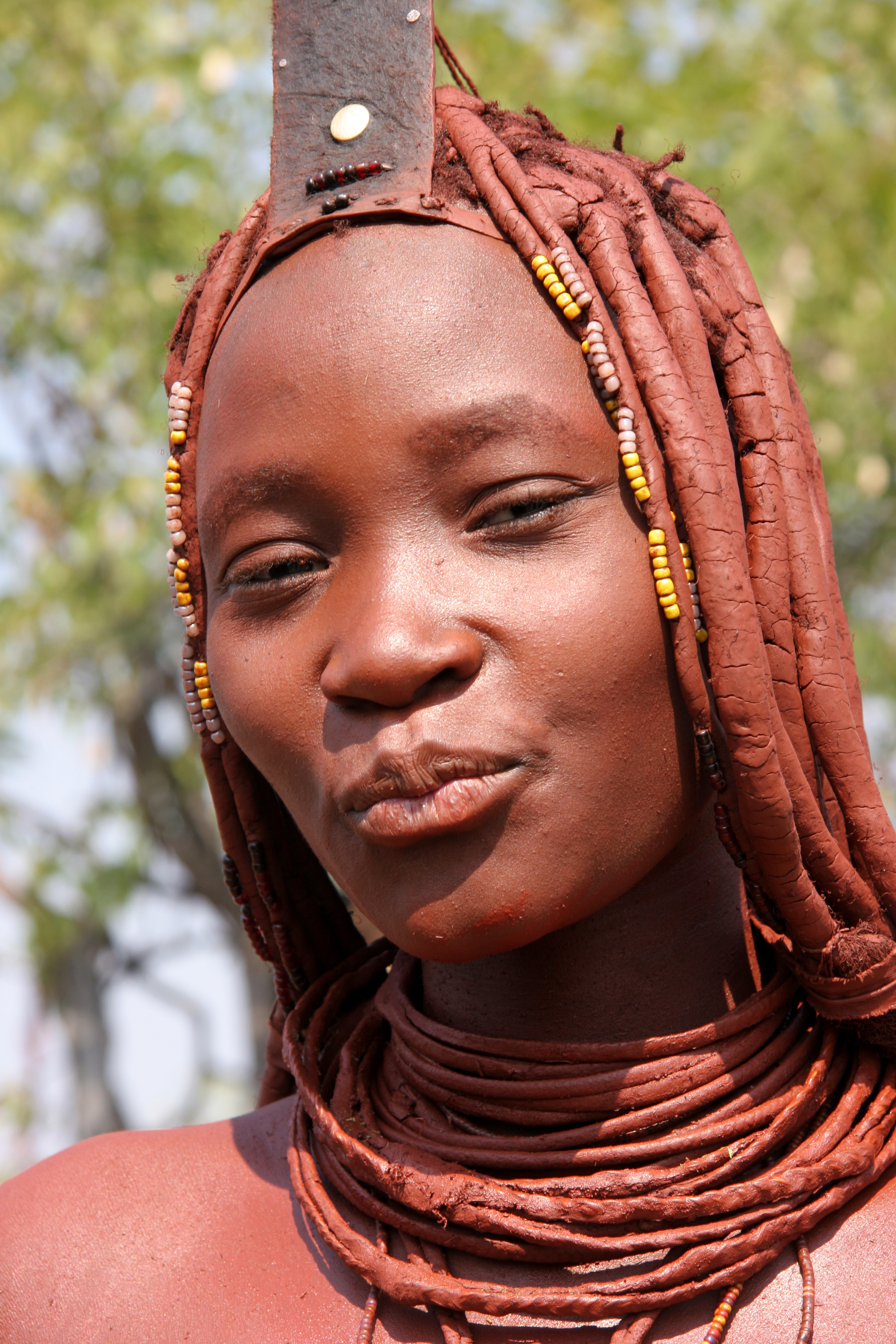
A Himba woman of northern Namibia, cosmetically adorned with red ochre.

The hypothesis of female cosmetic coalitions (FCC) represents a controversial attempt to explain the evolutionary emergence of art, ritual and symbolic culture in Homo sapiens. The hypothesis was first proposed by evolutionary anthropologists Chris Knight and Camilla Power together with archaeologist Ian Watts. It has since been tested, critiqued, confirmed and/or extended by scientists studying the emergence of human symbolic culture, especially symbolic ritual and art. Prominent figures among them are Cedric Boeckx, specialist in the cross-cultural study of indigenous myths, Deon Liebenberg, Cape Town rock art specialists Emily-Jane Vowles and John Parkington, and middle Stone Age archaeologist Rimtautas Dapschauskas and his team.

Supporters of this hypothesis contest the prevailing assumption that the earliest art was painted or engraved on external surfaces such as cave walls or rock faces. They argue instead that art is much older than previously thought and that the canvas was initially the human body. The earliest art, according to FCC, consisted of predominantly blood-red designs produced on the body for purposes of cosmetic display, the aim being to signal the inviolability or 'sacredness' of the human body.

Female cosmetic coalitions as a conceptual approach links Darwin's theory of evolution by natural and sexual selection, research into sexual signalling by wild-living monkeys and apes, the fossil record of encephalization in human evolution, recent archaeological discoveries of red-ochre pigments dating back to the speciation in Africa of Homo sapiens around 250,000 years ago, and modern hunter-gatherer ethnography.

These topics were first connected in several publications attempting to explain why Homo sapiens became prevalent, instead of the equally large-brained, previously successful Neanderthals. In 2016, the journal Current Anthropology published an article describing exhaustive archaeological testing of the FCC hypothesis, including robust debate between specialists.

Of course, not everyone is convinced, but anthropologists are starting to take the idea seriously. One of its strengths is that it addresses the question of why symbolic culture evolved, rather than simply how it did so, according to Robin Dunbar from the University of Liverpool.

— K. Douglas

== Details of the FCC model ==
=== Reproductive synchrony ===
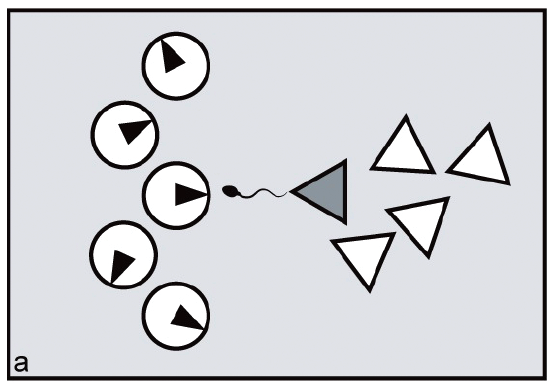
Figure a. Females competing for good genes should avoid ovulatory synchrony. Moving from one female to the next, a single dominant male under these conditions can exercise a monopoly. Key: Circle = female. Pointer = ovulation. Triangle = male.

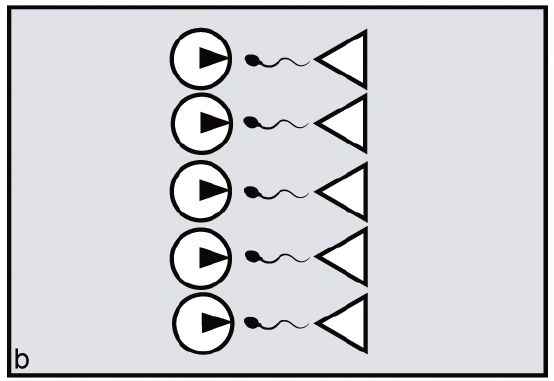
Figure b. Females in need of male time and energy should synchronise their cycles, preventing any single male from monopolising access.

In primates, reproductive synchrony usually takes the form of conception and birth seasonality. The regulatory 'clock', in this case, is the sun's position in relation to the tilt of the earth. In nocturnal or partly nocturnal primates—for example, owl monkeys— the periodicity of the moon may also come into play. Synchrony in general is for primates an important variable determining the extent of 'paternity skew'—defined as the extent to which fertile matings can be monopolised by a fraction of the population of males. The greater the precision of female reproductive synchrony—the greater the number of ovulating females who must be guarded simultaneously—the harder it is for any dominant male to succeed in monopolising a harem all to himself. This is simply because, by attending to any one fertile female, the male unavoidably leaves the others at liberty to mate with his rivals. The outcome is to distribute paternity more widely across the total male population, reducing paternity skew (figures a, b).

=== Concealed ovulation, synchrony and evolution ===
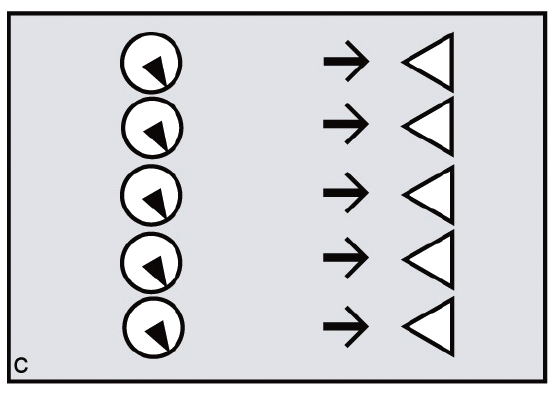
Figure c. Males abandon females once ovulation has passed.

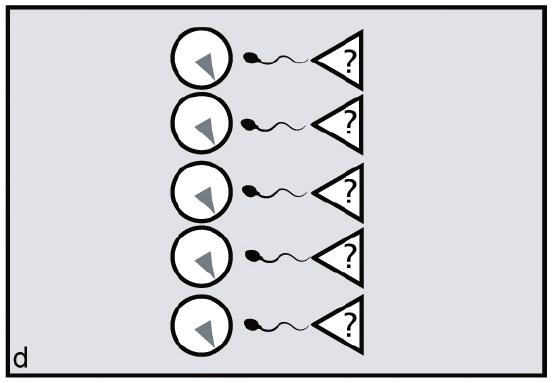
Figure d. Females counter this problem by concealing ovulation and extending receptivity.

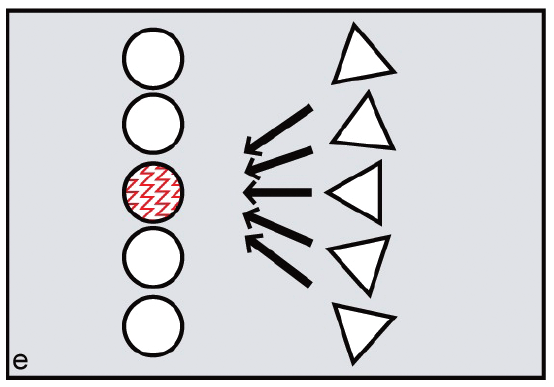
Figure e. Menstruation now attracts disproportionate male attention.

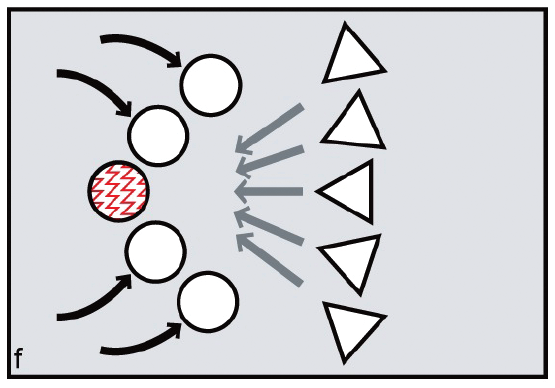
Figure f. Coalition members respond to this threat by controlling male access to the (imminently) fertile female.

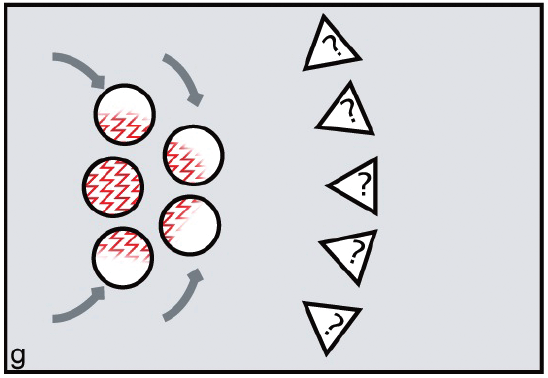
Figure g. To prevent males from picking and choosing between them, members of the coalition join forces and 'paint up'.

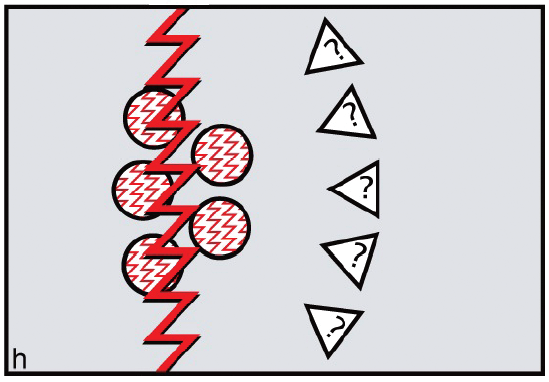
Figure h. "Wrong sex, wrong species, wrong time."

Reproductive synchrony can never be perfect. On the other hand, theoretical models predict that group-living species will tend to synchronise wherever females can benefit by maximising the number of males offered chances of paternity, minimising reproductive skew. The same models predict that female primates, including evolving humans, will tend to synchronise wherever fitness benefits can be gained by securing access to multiple males. Conversely, group-living females who need to restrict paternity to a single dominant harem-holder should assist him by avoiding synchrony.

In the human case, according to FCC, evolving females with increasingly heavy childcare burdens would have done best by resisting attempts at harem-holding by locally dominant males. No human female needs a partner who will get her pregnant only to disappear, abandoning her in favour of his next sexual partner. To any local group of females, the more such philandering can be successfully resisted—and the greater the proportion of previously excluded males who can be included in the breeding system and persuaded to invest effort—the better. By evolving concealed ovulation and continuous receptivity, females force males into longer periods of consortship if they are to have a good chance of achieving impregnation (figures c,d). Reproductive synchrony—whether seasonal, lunar or a combination of the two—is a key strategy for reproductive levelling, reducing paternity skew and involving more males in investment in offspring. Greater reproductive synchrony owing to seasonality during glacial cycles may have differentiated Neanderthal reproductive strategies from those of Homo sapiens ancestors.

=== Costs of increasing brain-size ===
In this model, the factor driving female strategies is the high cost to females of increasingly large-brained offspring, requiring increased investment from males. As females of Homo heidelbergensis, the ancestor of Neanderthals and modern humans, came under increasing selection pressure for larger brain size within the past half million years, they needed more energy in support. This meant greater productivity by males as hunters. However, in the Darwinian world of primate sexual competition, males may be more interested in finding new fertile females than in helping bring provisions for pregnant or nursing mothers and their infants. Women, unlike chimpanzees, have evolved concealed ovulation, in this way hiding whether they are fertile or not. But it is less easy to hide menstrual blood. Menstruation marks out imminently fertile females from those who are already pregnant or nursing. The primate-style roving male might selfishly exploit such information to pick out his next fertile target at the expense of his previous babies and their mother. According to FCC, there are good reasons why women tend to resist the idea of males picking and choosing between them on the basis of intimate details concerning their fertility status.

=== Menstruation, synchrony and cosmetics ===
FCC proponents argue that menstruation became a damaging social problem owing to its tendency to spark violent disputes between both females and males. Menstruation has no such impact among chimpanzees because in their case ovulation, rendered externally visible as sexual swellings, is what males are most interested in. But once external signs of ovulation had been phased out in the human lineage, according to FCC, menstruation would have become salient as the one remaining external promise of fertility. Potentially, dominant males could enhance their fitness by exploiting such information, repeatedly targeting newly cycling females at the expense of pregnant or nursing mothers (figure e).

Threatened with loss of male provisioning support, grandmothers and child-burdened mothers needed to take action. According to FCC, older and more experienced females enhanced their Darwinian fitness by initiating newly cycling females into their kin-based coalitions (figures f, g). Red ochre pigments allowed women to take conscious control over their menstrual signals, resisting any dominant male strategy of picking and choosing between them on biological grounds. Because precise, sustained menstrual synchrony is difficult to achieve, painting up with blood-red pigments was the next best thing, enabling the benefits of artificial, ritually constructed synchrony.

=== Effect on male strategies ===
To explore a male strategic point of view, proponents of FCC make a simple model of alternative strategies. Female A uses cosmetics as part of her ritual coalition whenever one of them menstruates; Female B and all her female neighbors use no cosmetics. Male A is prepared to work/invest to gain access; Male B tries a philanderer strategy, moving to the next cycling fertile female, neglecting the previous partner once she is pregnant. Very quickly, Male A will end up working/doing bride-service for Female A's coalition, since he has no competition from Male B. Male A gains regular fitness as a result. Male B will pair up with Female B, but is then liable to abandon her if he finds a new cycling female. She then has little support during pregnancy/breastfeeding. The question will be whether Male B gains sufficient fitness via a roving strategy of picking up cycling, non-cosmetic females. If Male A is not able to compete with Male B in terms of dominance, he is better off choosing the cosmetic females. Because Female B and her non-cosmetic female neighbors get the attentions, but no reliable investment, from Male B, they discourage any investment from the likes of Male A. Once costs of encephalization begin to bite and cooperative strategies are needed to support offspring, how many females will be choosing philanderers in preference to investors? Those females are not likely to be ancestors of large-brained hominins like ourselves or the Neanderthals.

=== Reverse dominance, sacredness and taboo ===
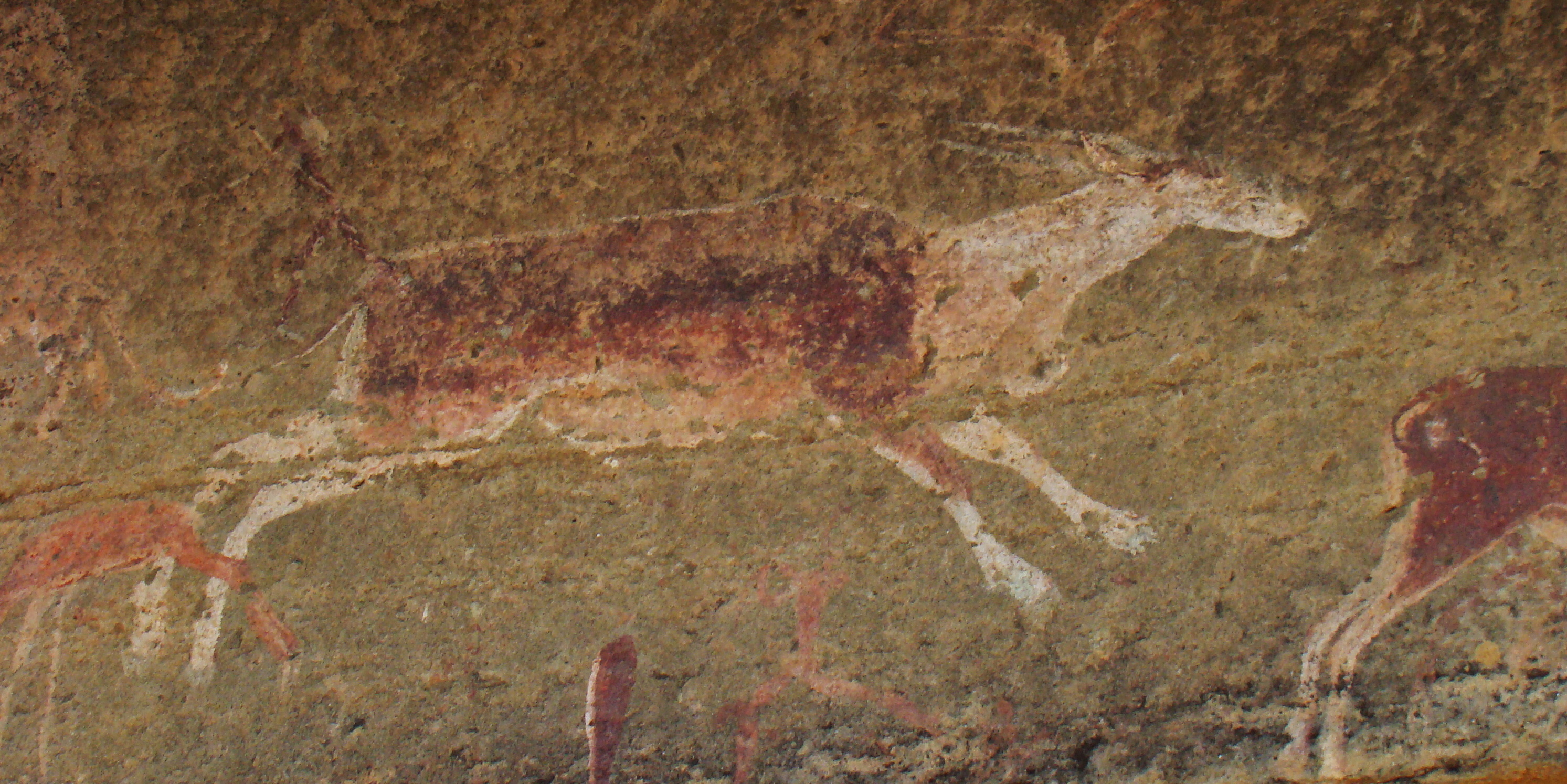
'Wrong species, wrong sex, wrong time.' In San rock art, a 'new maiden' is identified during her first menstruation ceremony as a sacred animal, the sex-ambivalent 'Eland Bull'. Rock painting of an eland, Drakensberg, South Africa.

Female strategies of counter-dominance culminated, according to this body of theory, in the eventual overthrow of primate-style dominance and its replacement by hunter-gatherer-style 'reverse dominance'. 'Reverse dominance' is defined by evolutionary anthropologists as an inverted social hierarchy—rule from below by an ungovernable community, leading to an egalitarian — in some cases gender-egalitarian — social order.

The FCC model predicts the specific form of reverse dominance display needed by female coalitions resisting would-be dominant or philanderer males. Females needed to signal 'No' by constructing themselves as inviolable using red ocher pigments. To assert ritual power, they needed to go periodically on 'sex strike'. To defend themselves physically against harassment by non-kin males, defiant females needed to draw on the support of male kin—sons and brothers—as members of their reverse dominance coalitions. In order to reverse signals of sexual availability, it was logical to sing and dance an unmistakable message: 'Wrong species, wrong sex, wrong time!'. On this basis, FCC theory leads us to expect 'divine' or 'totemic' spiritual entities depicted in early rock art to be therianthropic ('wrong species'), sex-ambivalent ('wrong sex') and blood-red ('wrong time') (figure h).

This brings FCC into line with Ḗmile Durkheim, who argued that the earliest divine beings were ritually generated representations of society. Durkheim's 'society', according to FCC, was in the first instance the bottom-up authority of Female Cosmetic Coalitions.

=== Interpreting the ochre record ===
"The use of ocher is particularly intensive: it is not unusual to find a layer of the cave floor impregnated with a purplish red to a depth of eight inches. The size of these ocher deposits raises a problem not yet solved. The colouring is so intense that practically all the loose ground seems to consist of ocher. One can imagine that the Aurignacians regularly painted their bodies red, dyed their animal skins, coated their weapons, and sprinkled the ground of their dwellings, and that a paste of ocher was used for decorative purposes in every phase of their domestic life. We must assume no less, if we are to account for the veritable mines of ocher on which some of them lived..."

— Leroi-Gourhan, A. 1968. The Art of Prehistoric Man in Western Europe. London: Thames & Hudson, p. 40.

It was once thought that art and symbolic culture first emerged in Europe some 40,000 years ago, during the Middle-to-Upper Palaeolithic transition – often termed the 'symbolic explosion' or 'Upper Palaeolithic revolution'. Some archaeologists still adhere to this view. Others now accept that symbolic culture probably emerged in sub-Saharan Africa at a much earlier date, during the period known as the Middle Stone Age. The evidence consists of traditions of ground ochre with strong selection for the colour red, examples of so-called ochre 'crayons' which appear to have been used for purposes of design, probably on the body, and geometric engravings on blocks of ochre. All this apparently formed part of a cosmetics industry dated to between 100,000 and 200,000 years ago. In addition, from about 100,000 years ago, we have pierced shells which appear to show signs of wear, suggesting that they were strung together to make necklaces. If the ochre tradition has been correctly interpreted, it constitutes evidence for the world's first 'art'—an aspect of 'symbolic culture'—in the form of personal ornamentation and body-painting. An alternative viewpoint is that pigment-only decorative systems are merely individualistic display, not necessarily indicative of ritual, whereas the bead traditions testify to language, institutionalized relationships and full-scale ritual and symbolic culture.

Striking Western Cape paintings apparently depicting female ritual coalitions - horizontal lines of spread-legged female figures - are reproduced in a 2025 article co-authored by Cape Town field archaeologists Emily-Jane Vowles and John Parkington. The authors write: "The assemblage is predominated by female figures, particularly rows of splayed-legged, squatting or crouching figures shown in the front-facing perspective with one arm extended towards the groin." Surveying evidence suggesting that Keurbos Cave 4 may have been a secret place reserved for menstrual ceremonies, the authors conclude by invoking FCC as the theoretical model best able to explain their archaeological findings:

"The nexus of our argument for repetitively held events at Keurbos 4 focused on and for women, and their menstrual rituals, lies in the symbolic connection between ochre (haematite) and blood (haemoglobin) and the requirements of seclusion, intimacy and privacy. In an intellectual lineage stretching back to Durkheim, in the wider evolutionary sense this nexus has been argued forcibly by Watts and his colleagues Knight and Power, who have shown that San conceptually link the blood of women’s menstruation with the blood of a hunting kill. This linkage leads to a wide range of prohibitions and observances relating to the dangers of menstruating and menarcheal women for active hunting males."

The most thorough recent survey of the African Middle Stone Age (MSA) ochre record is presented by Rimtautas Dapschauskas and colleagues. In a meta-analysis of 100 African sites, they ask when and where habitual ochre use emerged and the significance this had for the development of ritual behavior. They directly address the Female Cosmetic Coalitions hypothesis and test its predictions. They identify three continent-wide distinct phases of ochre use: an initial phase (500-330 thousand years ago); an emergent phase (330-160 ka); and an habitual phase from 160 ka, when a third of sites from South to East Africa and up to North Africa contain red ochre. In agreement with the FCC model, the authors regard 'habitual ochre use as a proxy for the emergence of regular collective rituals'. They view 'a large proportion of ochre finds from the MSA as the material remains of past ritual activity'. This builds cogently on the position taken by the FCC team three decades ago – that the ochre marked ritual activity critical to the emergence of symbolic cognition.

=== Implications for the origins of language ===
Proponents of this model claim that it helps to explain when and how language in our species emerged. Among 'Machiavellian', competitive nonhuman primates, sex is a major source of conflict, mutual suspicion and mistrust, as a result of which group members attempt to minimise the cost of deception by responding only to bodily signals which are intrinsically 'hard to fake'. Such resistance to low-cost, volitional signalling prevents language from even beginning to emerge. FCC theorists argue that for signals as cheap and intrinsically unreliable as words to become socially accepted, unprecedentedly intense levels of in-group trust were required. An effect of the Female Cosmetic Coalitions strategy, claim its supporters, was to minimise internal sexual conflict within each gender group, giving rise to a trusting social atmosphere such as is found among extant human egalitarian hunter-gatherers. These new levels of public trust, according to supporters of the model, enabled our species' latent linguistic capacities to flourish where previously they had been suppressed.

Too many candidate theories are either too vague, or make predictions that fall outside the available evidence. In contrast, a good example in this regard is the Female Cosmetic Coalitions Model, which does provide specific testable predictions.

— Johansson, S. 2014. How can a social theory of language evolution be grounded in evidence? In D. Dor, C. Knight and J. Lewis (eds), The Social Origins of Language. Oxford: Oxford University Press, pp. 64-56

== Testable predictions of the model ==
Its supporters claim that FCC is the only Darwinian theory to explain why there is so much red ochre in the early archaeological record of modern humans and why modern humans are then associated with red ochre wherever they went as they emerged from Africa. It is claimed that, more than any other theoretical model of modern human origins, FCC offers detailed and specific predictions testable in the light of data from a wide variety of disciplines.

=== Archaeology ===
- Earliest evidence of symbolic behaviour should be found in a cosmetics industry focused on blood-red pigments.

=== Palaeontology ===
- The time-window should fit with fossil evidence for encephalization rates. On this basis, the earliest onset of the strategy should neither pre-date c. 600,000 B.P. nor post-date c. 150,000 B.P., by which time modern levels of cranial capacity had evolved.

=== Kinship and male investment ===
- Matrilocal residence with bride service is expected as the initial situation.

=== Ethnography of magico-religious symbolism ===
- Counter-dominance should generate collective counter-reality. The first gods are therefore expected to be represented as WRONG + RED (wrong species/sex/time).
- Hunters' prohibitions on sex and menstruation are expected to operate within a lunar/menstrual cosmology.

== Results ==
Proponents of FCC argue that the main predictions which can be derived from their model should be easy, in principle, to falsify.

In their recent survey of the MSA ochre record, Dapschauskas and colleagues confirm FCC's prediction that no ochre should be found in Acheulean levels (i.e. before 600,000 B.P.). While these authors identify three phases of the ochre record – initial, emergent and habitual – the FCC team always argued for two basic stages, firstly an ad hoc stage with improvisatory use of cosmetics and then, driven by increased brain size, a second stage in which ocher use became regular and habitual while underpinning a symbolically structured sexual division of labour. Despite this divergence in terminology, both teams agree on the critical point that humans began using ocher regularly and habitually for ritual purposes from around 160,000 years ago. As Dapschauskas and colleagues explain: 'Multiple lines of evidence suggest that red ochre was in large part used for ritual purposes during the MSA. If this is true, then the long-term pattern of ochre use indicates that collective ritual first evolved slowly and gradually, starting about 500,000 years ago, but later accelerated to become a habitual cultural phenomenon between 160,000 and 40,000 years ago spanning most of the African continent. In an article published in 1995, the FCC team focused on the intersection of increasing brain size (putting extra energetic demands on mothers) with the cold, dry Marine Isotope Stage 6 (MIS6), when people would have experienced severe energy pinch points during lean, dry seasons. Knight, Power and Watts argued: 'Reproductive stress motoring "sham menstruation" may have become most acute in the period 160-140 Kya, the height of the Penultimate Glacial Cycle.'

FCC theory is currently being debated, having received significant media coverage. Despite this, not all scholars agree and the model remains controversial.

== See also ==
- Body art
- Body painting
- Cosmetics
- Human evolution
- Cognitive revolution
- Origins of society
- Sex strike
- Symbolic culture
- Prehistoric art
- Ochre
- Reproductive synchrony
- Menstrual synchrony
- Blood Relations: Menstruation and the Origins of Culture
