= Blood Relations: Menstruation and the Origins of Culture =

American non fiction book

Blood Relations: Menstruation and the Origins of Culture is a book by the evolutionary anthropologist Chris Knight. Published by Yale University Press in hardback 1991 and in paperback four years later, it has remained in print ever since.

The book outlines a new theory of human origins, focusing particularly on the emergence of symbolic ritual, kinship, religion and mythic belief. Previously, the main theory in currency was that of Claude Lévi-Strauss, who claimed that culture's rule over nature was established by men when they invented the incest taboo.

According to Lévi-Strauss, a point came when the human mind proved capable of distinguishing between 'sister' and 'wife'. Equipped with that ability, human males who had previously kept their sisters to themselves offered them in matrimonial exchange to other males, who reciprocated by making a return gift of their own sisters. In this way, rule-governed society became established as alliances were forged between neighbouring groups of men. Lévi-Strauss claims that in addition to the incest taboo, men invented a further series of critically important rules concerning such things as the timing of menstruation, cooking, romantic attachment and the wearing of personal ornaments.

In making his very different case, Knight draws on evidence not only from mythology – Lévi-Strauss' primary source – but from a wide range of disciplines including human behavioural ecology, hunter-gatherer ethnography, Paleolithic archaeology, palaeontology, rock art studies, modern genetics and studies of monkeys and apes in the wild. For Knight, symbolic culture emerged through Darwinian processes of gradual evolution culminating eventually in revolutionary change.

== The 'sex-strike' theory of human origins ==
Most theoretical accounts of the origins of rule-based social life are 'top-down' in the sense that they envisage some dominant force, typically male, as constructing and enforcing the incest taboo and other fundamental rules. Knight's model differs starkly in postulating an essentially counter-dominant, 'bottom-up' social dynamic as the factor responsible for the world's first morally authoritative rules.

Knight's model has often been termed the 'sex-strike' theory. Females band together to resist male sexual harassment or violence, drawing on assistance from supportive sons and brothers in collective self defence. As a weapon of last resort, such female-led kin-coalitions will support one another in denying sex to any abusive, lazy or unhelpful males. As this strategy becomes embedded, women go on periodic sex-strike to underline their value and motivate men to leave camp and go hunting as a condition of sex.

In attributing creative agency to females in establishing the cultural realm, Knight turns Lévi-Strauss upside-down, claiming that his new theory is more simple, parsimonious and consistent with the rest of science. In his view, the human revolution – the momentous transition from nature to culture – is eventually consummated when females successfully mount collective resistance to male sexual thoughtlessness or abuse.

These ideas suggest a radically different explanation for the initial establishment of the incest taboo. In Knight's model, it emerges as a logical consequence of going on strike. In response to the potential threat of sexual coercion or rape, women recruit sons and brothers as members of their sex-strike coalition. Once a young male has been initiated into such a defensive alliance, it would be unthinkable for him to impose himself sexually on those sisters and mothers whose sexual resistance he is upholding. Once initiated, therefore, young men must look outside their coalition (their 'clan' or 'lineage') for sex – resulting in the pattern of 'exogamy' or 'marrying out' so characteristic of traditional systems of kinship and residence. According to Knight, collective resistance to prohibited sex also explains why kinship terminology in traditional cultures is so regularly 'classificatory', meaning that women address other female coalition members of the same generation as 'sister' while men similarly use the term 'brother'.

== The Hunter's 'Own Kill' rule ==
Knight describes how traditional hunters recurrently link the incest prohibition with its counterpart on the economic plane, the rule against consuming the flesh of an animal one has killed oneself. Although many anthropologists had noticed such a prohibition while working in the field, each scholar had imagined it to be a local peculiarity without any relevance to classical concepts in the study of religion – topics such as 'rites of atonement', 'guardian spirits of the game animals', 'totemism' or 'sacrifice'. Noticing a common underlying pattern, Knight suggests that all these ideas so central to religious practices across the world have their origin in a once universal 'own kill' taboo.

Largely unnoticed by academics until 'Blood Relations' drew attention to it, what Knight terms 'the hunter's own kill rule' is almost universally recognized, even under deteriorating economic conditions which have prompted it to be evaded or ignored. Among the Mountain Arapesh people of Papua New Guinea:

“The lowest man in the community, the man who is believed to be so far outside the moral pale that there is no use reasoning with him, is the man who eats his own kill – even though that kill be a tiny bird, hardly a mouthful in all.”

Most significantly, from Knight's point of view, Margaret Mead stresses how in Arapesh culture "the taboo against eating one's own kill is equated with incest". By this, Mead means that just as men should make their sisters available to other men as wives, so they should generously make flesh from the animals they hunt available to others as food.

After listing and describing comparable traditions from across the world, Knight concludes that hunters' varied and often ingenious strategies for getting around the own flesh rule are as interesting as the many instances of compliance. For example, the prohibition might be weakened by applying it only to hunters who have not yet reached a certain age, or only to the first animal you kill in a given season. A widespread indigenous belief is that if you apologize profusely to the animal or its spirit, you may hope to be forgiven for eating it. Frequently misunderstood as kindhearted sentimentality toward animals, Knight argues that the sense of guilt is prompted by an awareness that the animal is being killed for selfish reasons, in defiance of the own kill taboo.

Finally, according to Knight, there is 'totemism' as classically defined – the idea that although your 'own flesh' (defined as a species of animal) must be respected, it is permissible to eat such an animal provided others have killed it, or kill your totemic animal on condition it will be eaten by others.

== The Dragon motif in ritual and mythology ==
The book culminates with a new explanation of the 'Dragon' motif in world mythology. According to Knight, the roots of this mythological creature are ancient, taking us back to when an ancestral population of humans evolved in Africa and began migrating across the world, taking with them their rituals and beliefs. Knight argues that religious beliefs are among the most conservative aspects of human symbolic culture, making them potentially a rich source of information about our distant evolutionary past when all humans still lived by hunting and gathering.

During the early decades of the twentieth century there was one place in the world where the Dragon was still being acted out regularly during the course of seasonally timed rituals of initiation. This place was the continent of Australia, where the many local variants of the Dragon became known by anthropologists as 'the Rainbow Serpent.'

In Knight's view, the Rainbow Snake was an imagined creature conjured up recurrently through ritual performance. It was a way of depicting the traumatic and unforgettable events and emotions experienced by boys and girls as they underwent their initiation into adult life. Since hunter-gatherer rites of passage were not scheduled randomly but at auspicious times of day or night, moon phase and season, the experiences they produced reflected cyclical time – an alternating movement between darkness and light, wet season and dry, rain and sunshine, death and new life. Knight points out that the Rainbow Snake or Dragon likewise moves through contraries. For example, it is the lowest of creatures – a snake – yet also the highest, since it has wings. It is a single creature, yet often with a plurality of heads. It lives in water, perhaps as the guardian of a sacred spring or waterhole, yet also spits out lightning fire. It is a non-human beast, but with human sexual appetites – it is famous for desiring maidens. It is gender-ambivalent, being sometimes male, sometimes female and sometimes both.

Knight notes that all of us find it hard to accept unfamiliar ideas or internalize concepts that form no part of our own culture. For this reason, we have a history of attempts to reduce the Dragon, Plumed Serpent or Anaconda to 'water', 'fertility', 'fear of venomous snakes' or some other concept or phenomenon familiar to us from our own culture. For Knight, such distortions of vision can best be corrected by turning to hunter-gatherer ethnography and other branches of social anthropology – disciplines designed precisely to enable us to transcend our own cultural assumptions. In Australia, this means listening carefully to the wisdom of Aboriginal elders – including words recorded by anthropologists at a time when informants could brush aside Western moral sensitivities and speak with pride about their own sacred knowledge and traditions.

When asked about the size of their great Snake, Knight reports, Aboriginal people might point to the horizon where earth meets sky, as if to indicate that it was that large. Asked about the creature's coloring or shape, they might refer to a rainbow. Asked about its length, they might refer to their traditional 'song-lines' or chains of extended kinship stretched for hundreds of miles across the landscape. Asked about its precise relationship to them, they would define this in terms of blood, perhaps viewing the Snake as their 'Mother's Brother', 'Mother' or the 'All-Mother' of the Aboriginal people as a whole.

Knight makes much of the fact that in north-east Arnhem Land, Australia, the rainbow snake was once acted out in elaborate ritual performances as part of the initiation of young men. These boys traditionally had their flesh cut during the ceremony and were encouraged to bleed together in synchrony with one another. Knight comments that local mythology treated such synchronized bleeding as a technique stolen by men from ancestral women – known as the Two Wawilak Sisters – who once conjured up the Snake by synchronizing their menstrual flows. As Yolngu men explain when they re-enact how these ancestral women's synchronized bleeding provoked Julunggul the Python into swallowing them alive:

“But really we have been stealing what belongs to them (the women), for it is mostly all woman’s business; and since it concerns them it belongs to them. Men have nothing to do really, except copulate, it belongs to the women. All that belonging to those Wauwelak, the baby, the blood, the yelling, their dancing, all that concerns the women; but every time we have to trick them. Women can’t see what men are doing, although it really is their own business, but we can see their side. This is because all the Dreaming business came out of women – everything; only men take ‘picture’ for that Julunggul (i.e. men make an artificial reproduction of the Snake). In the beginning we had nothing, because men had been doing nothing; we took these things from women.”

Whereas most Western anthropologists dismiss such stories as fanciful, Knight believes that they can tell us a great deal. For example, they help explain why Aboriginal men traditionally considered it so important to shed their own blood together during their initiation ceremonies. Knight believes that there may be some truth in the idea that initiation was originally a joyful celebration of a girl's first menstrual onset, and that when male initiations assumed greater prominence they were initially inspired by and modeled on that women-led menstrual precedent.

This would solve many puzzles, including the Snake or Dragon's legendary demand for a regular supply of maidens. The truth (according to Knight) is that for a girl to be initiated, she had to bleed with other women and become engulfed in the combined flow – 'swallowed alive by a Dragon' – just as boys undergoing initiation had to bleed together and be 'swallowed alive' before being reborn.

Knight's interpretation is that when initiated males came to establish their dominance over the female sex, they set about usurping women's former power, justifying their dominance by claiming that they, too, could synchronously menstruate and give birth. Hence when men began monopolizing ritual power in the name of the Rainbow Serpent, they were striving to turn women's mythic former sovereignty against living women and girls themselves. In China and the East, the Emperor's sovereignty was traditionally personified as a Dragon in much the same way, suggesting that no ruler could exercise legitimate sovereignty without doing so in the Dragon's name.

Knight argues that if we are aware of such historical and ethnographic details, we are much more likely to comprehend the ultimate origins and world-wide significance of the Dragon. It is, he suggests, an image of the heavenly intimacy, solidarity and sense of communion out of which religious awareness first emerged. It is certainly not a representation of any physical or biological thing. Rather, according to Knight, it represents mothers and daughters, sisters and brothers acting together in solidarity during rituals that were designed to encourage women's menstrual cycles to beat in synchrony with wider periodicities governed by moon, season and tides. If male heroes had to confront and defeat a Dragon who desired menstruating maidens, it was because these dominant males recognized their adversary as a many-headed counter-dominant threat to their power.

== Testing the model ==
One of Knight's findings is that taboos around menstruation are deeply rooted in every traditional culture, taking surprisingly similar forms. Knight suggests that what have now become irrational and oppressive taboos were originally established by women in order to assert their periodic inviolability, an idea that in recent years has gained some currency. He attributes the ubiquity of these rules and taboos to their antiquity and to the probability that they once upheld all other moral, religious and cultural taboos.

In Knight's model, female intolerance of male harassment or abuse reaches a peak each month around menstruation, when women declare themselves to be temporarily 'set apart' or 'sacred'. It has often been noted that women who endure men's demands over most days during each month may have a lower tolerance threshold just before menstruation. This lends a periodic structure to women's levels of energy and willingness to comply with male demands.

Knight notes that the human female cycle has an average periodicity of approximately 29.5 days, making it compatible in principle with the periodicity of the moon. This is in contrast to our close great ape relative the chimpanzee, whose menstrual cycle length is around 36 days. Knight's point here is that female chimpanzees could not synchronize their cycles with the Moon even if they wanted to, whereas human females do seem to possess a strikingly close approximation to the necessary menstrual cycle length.

Knight remarks on the extent to which an 'ideology of blood' permeates ritual performances and cosmological beliefs among hunter-gatherers across the world, noting how elements of these beliefs are preserved in diverse forms even as horticulture, cattle herding and farming replace hunting and gathering. One feature which persists into historically more recent religions is the salience of blood as core marker of sanctity and potency. When Knight was writing, his suggestion of an intimate link between incest prohibitions and menstrual taboos seemed surprising and original although in reality, this aspect of his thinking was not new, having been proposed by the founder of modern sociology, Emile Durkheim, as long ago as 1898.

Knight acknowledges that his theory is at odds with mainstream thinking. He responds by arguing that because it makes surprisingly detailed and often unexpected predictions, his theory is unusual in being testable in the light of empirical evidence.

One of Knights's theoretical predictions, made in 1991, was that future archaeological research should find that the earliest fully-cultural humans were regularly using red ocher pigments as cosmetics in their ritual displays. In 2002, this prediction was confirmed by the archaeologist Ian Watts when, as the ocher specialist working in a team led by Chris Henshilwood, he announced an early date for the world's first art. Among the team's discoveries were cross-hatched patterns engraved on pieces of ocher apparently used as body paint, found in Blombos Cave, South Africa, and dated to more than 70,000 years ago. According to Watts, the kinds of ocher most frequently utilized were especially valued because their color suggested that of fresh blood.

Another of Knight's predictions was that future archaeological research should confirm the centrality of lunar periodicity to ancient hunting schedules and their depiction as calendars in rock and cave art. In 1991, Knight cited the Ice Age lunar notation systems described by Alexander Marshack in his 1972 book, The Roots of Civilization. Unfortunately for Knight, Marshack's interpretations were then being dismissed by critics as 'wishful thinking'. Since then, however, many specialists have begun changing their minds as an increasing number of Paleolithic rock art images and cave paintings have lent weight to Marshack's original interpretations. Today, there is widespread agreement that early hunter-gatherers perceived significant correspondences between menstrual and lunar periodicities, scheduling their ceremonies and hunting patterns to achieve what for them was the ultimate ideal of synchrony with the Moon.

Another of Knight's predictions concerned structures of family, residence and kinship. In 1991, the consensus was that early human hunters must have lived in patrilocal bands. Knight's model seemed difficult to accept because it presupposed strong female kin-based coalitions, early hunter-gatherer women choosing to live with and share childcare with their own mother and other female relatives. In the years since Knight's book was written, a number of developments – including Kristen Hawks' 'grandmother hypothesis', Sarah Hrdy's 'alloparenting' model and Camilla Power's 'Female Cosmetic Coalitions' hypothesis – have indicated that early human postmarital residence patterns are unlikely to have been patrilocal. Paleogenetic studies over recent decades have confirmed that among African hunter-gatherers, matrilocal residence during the early years of marriage was traditionally the norm.

== Reception ==
Positive

Knight's book was favorably reviewed in The Times Higher Education Supplement, The Times Literary Supplement and The London Review of Books; it also received publicity through an interview on the BBC World Service Science Now program, a debate with Dr. Henrietta Moore on BBC Radio 4 Woman’s Hour, a front-page news report in The Independent on Sunday and Daily Telegraph and coverage in many other periodicals. In April 1998, the Independent on Sunday featured a two-page article on Knight's work by science correspondent Marek Kohn, who described Knight's approach to human origins as ‘drawing together some of the most dynamic lines of argument in current British evolutionary thought’.

“This book may be the most important ever written on the evolution of human social organization. It brings together observation and theory from social anthropology, primatology, and paleoanthropology in a manner never before equalled. The author, Chris Knight, is up to date on all these fields and has achieved an extraordinary synthesis. His critiques of Claude Lévi-Strauss on totemism and myth are a sheer tour de force.”

— Alex Walter, Department of Anthropology, Rutgers University

“A man writing about menstruation as empowering not polluting; a Marxist analysis in which sex solidarity and class analysis assume equal explanatory power; a fully social and revolutionary account of our human cultural origins that privileges women; an explicitly political narrative of science in the first person; an interweaving of anthropology, biology, history of ideas, and philosophy; an attempt not just to interpret the world but to change the world: Blood Relations is all this and more.”

— Diane Bell, 1994. American Ethnologist 21(4):903

“Ignoring this book is a mistake. It is a very readable, witty, lively treasure-trove of anthropological wisdom and insight ... Chris Knight has taken on the task of explicating not only the whys and hows of human cultural evolution, but also vast constellations of cultural behaviour covering Australia, Africa, Europe and all of the Americas. In this endeavour he is extraordinarily cross-disciplinary in his approach, utilizing insights from cultural anthropology, sociology, sociobiology and palaeo- and ethno-archaeology. In short, Knight is a complete anthropologist, one who realizes the value of exploring all corners of his field to synthesize disparate work into a cohesive whole... And his scholarship is impeccable. While many of us rarely bother to read ‘the greats’ of our field any more, Knight delves deep into Durkheim, Frazer and Lévi-Strauss and many others, coming up with long-forgotten insights and providing his readers with an enormously useful review of a century of evolutionary theory and ethnographic data. In fact, as a feminist, I would very much like it if Knight’s story turned out to be true, since it gives so much credit to women’s collective solidarity, strike power and biological and intellectual creativity... Best of all, it's a story that's ‘good to think with’. It made me review in my mind everything I ever learned about evolution and rethink it in a new way.”

— R. E. Davis-Floyd, Journal of the Royal Anthropological Institute

In 1997, the feminist journalist and historian Barbara Ehrenreich welcomed and made use of Knight's ideas in her book, Blood Rites: The origins and history of the passions of war. Among major poets, Ted Hughes and Peter Redgrove favourably cited Knight's insights concerning menstrual synchrony and its place in world mythology and folklore.

The sculptor Anish Kapoor drew inspiration from Knight's work, describing how his appreciation of the colour red – in, for example, Kapoor's celebrated sculpture Blood Relations – owes much to Knight's 'wonderful theory' that the world's first art was produced when women began decorating themselves with red ochre cosmetics.

Another prominent figure inspired by Knight's book is the Chilean revolutionary activist and artist Cecilia Vicuña. Having studied Knight's work over many years, she associates the blood-red woolen quipus or 'Red Threads' central to much of her recent work with the string figures and images of menstruating goddesses in Aboriginal Australian rock-art as described and interpreted by Knight in his book.

Although Knight's theory of human cultural and symbolic origins remains controversial, in the years since Blood Relations was published it has become central to an increasing body of archaeological research and debate on how symbolic culture in our species first emerged.

Negative

Knight's book was negatively reviewed by Chris Harman of the Socialist Workers' Party, who dismissed it as 'Menstrual Moonshine' incompatible with Marxist theoretical premises. A review published in the International Communist Current found grounds for welcoming Knight's book despite criticizing it on political grounds. Feminist critic Joan Gero found Knight's book 'offensive' on somewhat different political grounds. In a harshly negative review, Gero wrote:

What Knight puts forward as an 'engendered' perspective on the origins of culture is a paranoid and distorting view of 'female solidarity', featuring (all) women as sexually exploiting and manipulating (all) men. Male-female relations are characterized forever and everywhere as between victims and manipulators; exploitative women are assumed always to have wanted to trap men by one means or another, and indeed their conspiring to do so serves as the very basis of our species' development.

— Joan Gero, Review of Chris Knight, Blood Relations, Menstruation and the Origins of Culture.

== New lines of research and debate ==
In the years since its publication, Knight's book has inspired a number of scholars from various disciplines to develop some of the underlying ideas.

- Pioneer hunter-gatherer ethnographer Richard Lee has welcomed the growing influence of the work of Knight and his colleagues in helping bring together the once mutually hostile sociocultural and bioevolutionary wings of anthropology.
- Camilla Power, an anthropologist at University College London, has shown how Knight's work opens the door to an entirely new way of understanding the evolutionary origins of art. The world's first artistic designs, claims Power, were painted not on cave walls but on the human body, as women began making ritual use of blood-red pigments to beautify and sanctify their bodies.
- Evolutionary anthropologist Camilla Power also collaborated with archaeologist Ian Watts to develop a more succinct, archaeologically up-to-date and consistently Darwinian version of the ideas first outlined in Knight's book. Watts has over the years established himself as arguably the world's foremost archaeological specialist in the ochre record of human evolution.
- Lionel Sims built on Knight's work to propose a new interpretation of Stonehenge, Avebury Stone Circle and other megalithic monuments, arguing that they were designed to help manage a difficult transition from primary reliance on lunar calendars in the planning of initiation rites and other ceremonies to a novel pattern of fixing dates with reference to seasonal changes associated with the sun. Sims' work contributed significantly to the establishment of 'Skyscape archaeology' as a specialist archaeological sub-discipline.
- Isabel Cardigos, late of the University of the Algarve, has fruitfully applied Knight's conceptual framework to the analysis of Portuguese fairy tales.
- In 2021, Anish Kapoor and Knight collaborated in publicising a major art exhibition in Oxford. The canvasses were spectacularly bloody explorations of the colour red. Much of the inspiration, said Kapoor, came from Knight's evolutionary argument that art first emerged in prehistoric times when dancing lines of women decorated their bodies with earth pigments and blood.
- For several decades, the Chilean revolutionary artist Cecilia Vicuña’s work has engaged with rituals involving red threads, rivers and streams of blood from Aboriginal Australia, South Africa, Paleolithic Europe, and pre-Columbian America. Many of her designs were modeled on Aboriginal Australian women's menstrual string figures and rock art imagery depicted in Knight's book, which had been inspiring her since she discovered it following its publication in 1991.

'What, then, is the Snake?' Chris Knight asks: 'What kind of snake was it, if people could participate in its body by dancing?' Why were the Two Wawilak Sisters 'swallowed by a Snake'? Were they swallowed by 'cyclical time'?

— Cecilia Vicuña, 2017. Read Thread. The story of the red thread. London: Sternberg Press, p. 17.

== See also ==
- Culture and menstruation
- Origins of society
- Dragon
- Rainbow Serpent
- Female cosmetic coalitions
- Reproductive synchrony
- Menstrual synchrony
- Ochre
