= The Kingdom of Speech =

2016 book by Tom Wolfe

- Cover of the first edition
- Author: Tom Wolfe
- Language: English
- Subject: Linguistics
- Publisher: Little, Brown
- Publication date: August 2016
- Publication place: United States
- Media type: Print
- Pages: 200
- ISBN: 978-0-316-26996-4

The Kingdom of Speech is a critique of Charles Darwin and Noam Chomsky written by Tom Wolfe. The book's criticisms of Chomsky are outlined in an article in Harper's.

In the book, Wolfe criticises Darwin and his colleagues for taking partial credit from Alfred Wallace for the theory of evolution and ignoring Wallace's later work on the theory. Wolfe then criticises Noam Chomsky for dismissing Daniel Everett, who disputes Chomsky's claim that all languages are based ultimately on a hard-wired mechanism known as the language acquisition device (LAD). Wolfe argues that speech, not evolution, sets humans apart from animals and is responsible for all of humanity's complex achievements.

== Critical response ==
In The Guardian, Steven Poole criticises Wolfe's whole approach to Darwin and dismisses his suggestion that Darwin had no evidence for his theory of evolution by natural selection, saying that Darwin "adduced a lot of evidence at the time, including the geographical distribution of species, comparative anatomy, fossils and the existence of vestigial organs. Today, of course, evolution is observed in real time in the laboratory, among microbes or insects."

In The Washington Post, Jerry Coyne agrees that Wolfe "grossly distorts the theory of evolution". He also notes that "Everett didn't slay [Chomsky's theory of] universal grammar: Later linguists found that the Pirahã language indeed had recursion (e.g., "I want the same hammock you just showed me"). Finally, the technical notion of recursion was never the totality of Chomsky's theory anyway. He highlighted the idea in a brief paper in 2003, but his theory always consisted of operations for merging words into bigger and bigger phrases, something no one disputes." In concluding his review, Coyne states that "I'm not sure why Wolfe bears such animus against evolution and the use of evidence rather than bluster to support claims about reality. Perhaps his social conservatism has bred such a discomfort with the implications of modern science - that the universe works by natural rather than supernatural or divine laws - that he's compelled to snicker at one of the foundations of modern science: He's called another one, the big bang, 'the nuttiest theory I've ever heard'."

In The Times, Oliver Kamm is equally critical, pointing out that Wolfe doesn't appreciate that Chomsky himself "is sceptical that the 'language organ' is a product of natural selection" and that, indeed, some "scholars believe that Chomsky underestimates the explanatory power of evolutionary theory." Harry Ritchie in The Spectator says "Wolfe is at his best when describing Chomsky's almost religiously cultish, charismatic hold over linguistics," but that Wolfe's "version of Chomsky's downfall is as wrong as Chomsky certainly is." David Z. Morris's in the Washington Independent points out that Wolfe "has proven his enduring ability to choose the right moment. Our views of language and human nature are shifting radically and quickly ... The Kingdom of Speech is traversing the right territory," but he then concludes that the book "is too loose, too glib, and, in a few places, too glaringly flawed."

In some contrast to these opinions, Peter York in The Sunday Times claims that the geneticist Steve Jones admires Wolfe's grasp of both the Darwin literature and the "real weaknesses" of Chomsky's view of language origins. While Everett himself has said Wolfe's book is "the opinion of someone who has looked carefully at the field for years. Some mistakes are likely his fault. Others are the fault of the field for having been unsuccessful in making itself understandable to the public." Everett has also tweeted that "Chomsky's view of [language] origins is nearly identical to Wolfe's view of evol[ution]. Both simplistic."

In The Chronicle of Higher Education, Tom Bartlett interviews both Wolfe and Chomsky, and compares and contrasts Wolfe's book with anthropologist Chris Knight's more "in-depth" investigation, "Decoding Chomsky: Science and revolutionary politics." In Bartlett's interview, Chomsky criticizes Wolfe, saying his "errors are so extraordinary that it would take an essay to review them."

John McWhorter observed in his Vox review that Wolfe revealed a fundamental misunderstanding of the Chomsky-Everett controversy, and concluded that the author "ultimately misses the essence of the debate from various angles." According to McWhorter's account, Wolfe misidentified both the topic of the discussion (which doesn't revolve around the origin of language, but cognitive mechanisms of language production) and its still inconclusive outcome by wrongly depicting Chomskyan linguists as clear losers and Everett as a "victorious gladiator in this scholarly clash."

== See also ==
- Noam Chomsky
- Daniel Everett
- Tom Wolfe
- Decoding Chomsky
