= Decoding Chomsky =

2016 book by Chris Knight

Decoding Chomsky: Science and Revolutionary Politics
- Cover
- Author: Chris Knight
- Language: English
- Subject: Noam Chomsky
- Publisher: Yale University Press
- Publication date: 2016 (hardback); 2018 (paperback)
- Publication place: United Kingdom
- Media type: Print (Hardcover and Paperback)
- Pages: 304
- ISBN: 978-0300221466

Decoding Chomsky: Science and Revolutionary Politics is a 2016 book by the anthropologist Chris Knight on Noam Chomsky's approach to politics and science. Knight argues that Chomsky's linguistic theories were influenced by immersion since the early 1950s in what Knight believes was an intellectual culture heavily dominated by US military priorities. Knight speculates that this influence expanded after Chomsky secured employment in a Pentagon-funded electronics laboratory at the Massachusetts Institute of Technology.

In October 2016, Chomsky dismissed the book, telling The New York Times that it was based on a false assumption since, in fact, no military "work was being done on campus" during his time at MIT. In a subsequent public comment, Chomsky on similar grounds denounced Knight's entire narrative as a "wreck ... complete nonsense throughout". Reviews in Current Affairs and Moment point out that Knight lacks training or expertise in the field and the book fails to engage with the subject or Chomsky's ideas. In Philosophy Now the reviewer observes that the book "is not a critique of a body of work in linguistics; it is an attempt to demonise a man for his perceived political deviations". In contrast, a reviewer for the US Chronicle of Higher Education described Decoding Chomsky as perhaps "the most in-depth meditation on 'the Chomsky problem' ever published".

There was correspondence about the book in the London Review of Books, where the sociologist of science Hilary Rose cited Decoding Chomsky approvingly, provoking Chomsky to criticise what he called "Knight's astonishing performance" in two subsequent letters. The debate around Decoding Chomsky then continued in Open Democracy, with contributions from Frederick Newmeyer, Randy Allen Harris and others.

== Synopsis ==
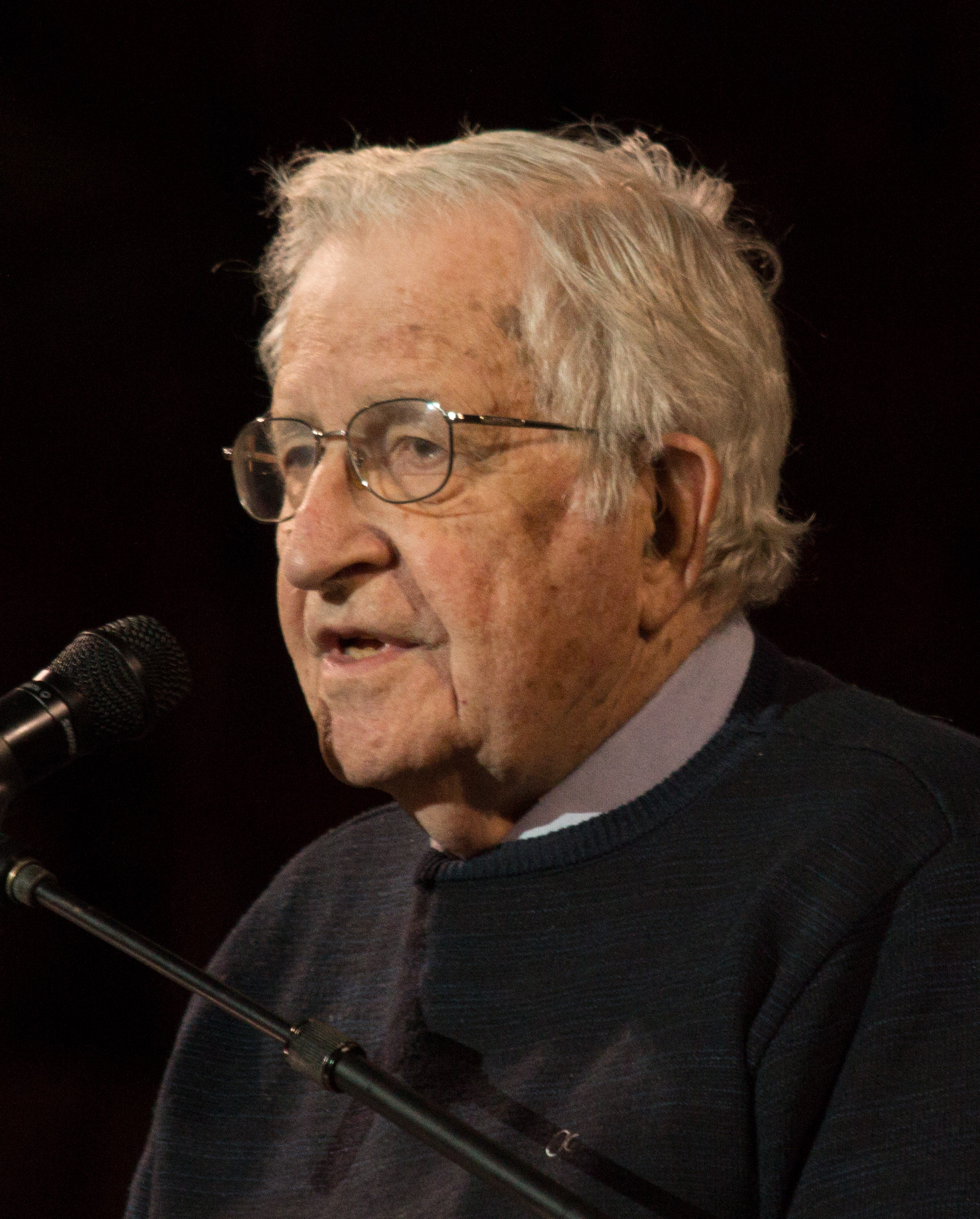
Noam Chomsky in 2017

Decoding Chomsky begins with Chomsky's claim that his political and scientific outputs have little connection with each other. For example, asked in 2006 whether his science and his politics are in any way related to one another, Chomsky replied that the connection is "almost non-existent ... There is a kind of loose, abstract connection in the background. But if you look for practical connections, they're non-existent."

Knight accepts that scientific research and political involvement are distinct kinds of activity serving very different purposes. But he claims that, in Chomsky's case, the conflicts intrinsic to his institutional situation forced him to drive an unusually deep and damaging wedge between his politics and his science.

Knight points out that Chomsky began his career working in an electronics laboratory whose primary technological mission he detested on moral and political grounds. Funded by the Pentagon, the Research Laboratory of Electronics at MIT was involved in contributing to the basic research required for hi-tech weapons systems. Suggesting that he was well aware of MIT's role at the time, Chomsky himself recalls:

There was extensive [military] research on the MIT campus. ... In fact, a good deal of the [nuclear] missile guidance technology was developed right on the MIT campus and in laboratories run by the university.

It was because of his anti-militarist conscience, Knight argues, that such research priorities were experienced by him as deeply troubling. By way of evidence, Knight cites George Steiner in a 1967 The New York Review of Books article, "Will Noam Chomsky announce that he will stop teaching at MIT or anywhere in this country so long as torture and napalm go on? ... Will he even resign from a university very largely implicated in the kind of 'strategic studies' he so rightly scorns?" Chomsky said, "I have given a good bit of thought to the specific suggestions that you put forth... leaving the country or resigning from MIT, which is, more than any other university, associated with activities of the department of 'defense.' ... As to MIT, I think that its involvement in the war effort is tragic and indefensible."

Chomsky's situation at MIT, according to Knight, is summed up by Chomsky when he describes some of his colleagues this way:

It is appalling that a person can come through an MIT education and say the kinds of things that were quoted in the New York Times article on Sunday, November 9 [1969]... One student said, right along straight Nazi scientist lines: What I'm designing may one day be used to kill millions of people. I don't care. That's not my responsibility. I'm given an interesting technological problem and I get enjoyment out of solving it. You know perfectly well that we can name twenty faculty members who've said the same thing. ... This is an attitude that is very widely held and very widely expressed.

In order to maintain his moral and political integrity, Knight argues, Chomsky resolved to limit his cooperation to pure linguistic theory of such an abstract kind that it could not conceivably have any military use.

With this aim in mind, Chomsky's already highly abstract theoretical modelling became so unusually abstract that not even language's practical function in social communication could be acknowledged or explored. One damaging consequence, according to Knight, was that scientific investigation of the ways in which real human beings use language became divorced from what quickly became the prevailing MIT school of formal linguistic theory.

Knight argues that the conflicting pressures Chomsky experienced had the effect of splitting his intellectual output in two, prompting him to ensure that any work he conducted for the military was purely theoretical—of no practical use to anyone—while his activism, being directed relentlessly against the military, was preserved free of any obvious connection with his science.

To an unprecedented extent, according to Knight, mind in this way became divorced from body, thought from action, and knowledge from its practical applications, these disconnects characterizing a philosophical paradigm which came to dominate much of intellectual life for half a century across the Western world.

== Reception ==
=== Negative ===
In Current Affairs, Norbert Hornstein and Nathan J. Robinson dismiss the book as exhibiting a complete misunderstanding of Chomsky's linguistic theories and beliefs. They question the motives of Yale University Press, asking why Yale considered it appropriate to publish Knight's critique, which they say attacks Chomsky through political conjecture rather than addressing his linguistic ideas. Comparing Knight's Marxist criticism to The Kingdom of Speech, a book by conservative author Tom Wolfe published the same year, they suggest that both were published with similar motivations: that Chomsky's criticisms were a threat to the power behind the publishers.

In Moment, Robert Barsky wrote that, since Knight was never formally trained in Chomsky's conception of theoretical linguistics, he has no right to comment on whether it stands up as science. Decoding Chomsky, writes Barsky, offers no original insights, consisting only of "a weak rehash of critiques from naysayers to Chomsky's approach". While Barsky concedes that Chomsky did work in a military laboratory, he writes that this is not significant, since virtually all US scientists receive Pentagon funding one way or another.

Peter Stone wrote that Knight clearly hates Chomsky and "for that reason he wrote Decoding Chomsky – a nasty, mean-spirited, vitriolic, ideologically-driven hatchet job". Stone states that, although Knight aligns himself with the political Left, "the level of venom on display here exceeds that of all but the most unhinged of Chomsky’s detractors on the Right." He states that "Knight spares no opportunity to paint Chomsky’s every thought and deed in the blackest possible terms" and that: "Decoding Chomsky is not a critique of a body of work in linguistics; it is an attempt to demonise a man for his perceived political deviations, even though that man happens to be on the same side of the political spectrum as the man who is demonising him. Reading Decoding Chomsky taught me something about the mindset of the prosecutors in the Moscow Show Trials."

The linguist Frederick Newmeyer concedes that the Pentagon expected to be able to use Chomsky's findings for military purposes, but says that the idea that Chomsky promoted very abstract approaches to linguistics in order to prevent such military use is 'implausible, to put it mildly' and states that Knight's portrayal of Chomsky's attitude to the study of language as a system of social communication is "a gross oversimplification". In the UK, the New Scientist also found that Knight goes beyond what the evidence shows, writing that "Trenchant and compelling as Knight's critique of Chomsky is, few scientists would follow him all the way to his concluding vision of science united with revolutionary politics."

=== Positive ===
Reviewing the book in The Times Literary Supplement, Houman Barekat commended Knight for an "engaging and thought-provoking intellectual history". In The American Ethnologist, Sean O'Neill said of the book: "History comes alive via compelling narrative. ... Knight is indeed an impressive historian when it comes to recounting the gripping personal histories behind Chomsky's groundbreaking contributions to science and philosophy."

In The Anarchist Imagination, political scientist Carl Levy commends Knight for documenting how Chomsky's notion of Universal Grammar echoed ideas put forward earlier by Claude Levi-Strauss, linguist Roman Jakobson, and Jakobson's muse, the anarchist poet and Russian revolutionary visionary Velimir Khlebnikov.

Linguist Daniel Everett wrote that "Knight's exploration is unparalleled. No other study has provided such a full understanding of Chomsky's background, intellectual foibles, objectives, inconsistencies, and genius." The linguist Gary Lupyan wrote that Knight "makes a compelling case for the scientific vacuousness of [Chomsky’s linguistic] ideas." According to Bruce Nevin in The Brooklyn Rail, "Knight shows how Chomsky has acquiesced in – more than that, has participated in and abetted – a radical post-war transformation of the relation of science to society, legitimating one of the significant political achievements of the right, the pretense that science is apolitical." Sarah Blaffer Hrdy praised Knight for dismissing as "a kind of madness" Chomsky's idea that language somehow emerged in our species suddenly and independently of previous Darwinian evolution.

Philosopher Thomas Klikauer wrote that Decoding Chomsky is "an insightful book and, one might say, a-pleasure-to-read kind of book." Another philosopher, Rupert Read described the book as "a brilliant, if slightly harsh, disquisition". In the Chronicle of Higher Education Tom Bartlett described the book as a "compelling read". In Anarchist Studies Peter Seyferth said the book "focuses on all the major phases of Chomsky's linguistic theories, their institutional preconditions and their ideological and political ramifications. And it is absolutely devastating."

“The overriding responsibility of the scientist who proposes a hypothesis or theory is to subject it to every imaginable experimental test that might disprove it, and if an idea cannot be tested, it has no more worth than the claims in an advertisement for toothpaste. Knight reviews how Chomsky’s proposals are notoriously inaccessible to empirical test and have become more so with each successive revision.”

— Bruce Nevin. Understanding the Labyrinth: Noam Chomsky’s Science and Politics. Brooklyn Rail, July 8, 2015.

David Golumbia has described himself as "a huge admirer of Decoding Chomsky" while Les Levidow described the book as "impressive". The linguist Randy Allen Harris praises the book as one which everyone interested in Chomsky should read, although he qualifies this by commenting "I don't think very much of its deliberate unusability theory". In defense of the author, however, Harris expresses his bemusement at Chomsky's "breathtaking" misreading of Knight's theory on this score. "Knight's whole argument", writes Harris, "depends on the premise that Chomsky 'was at all times refusing to collude' with the military", making it astonishing that "Chomsky seems to think that Knight slanderously accuses him of complicity with the U.S. military - that his active resistance to the war in Vietnam refutes Knight's position rather than, as it actually does, supports Knight's position." In line with Knight and also with his fellow expert in Chomskyan linguistics, Frederick Newmeyer, Harris acknowledges that:

"… the military investment in Chomskyan theory, whether at MIT or elsewhere, was expected to produce results for such military applications as encryption, machine translation, information retrieval, and command-and-control systems for jets and weapon delivery."

== Further research on Chomsky at MIT ==
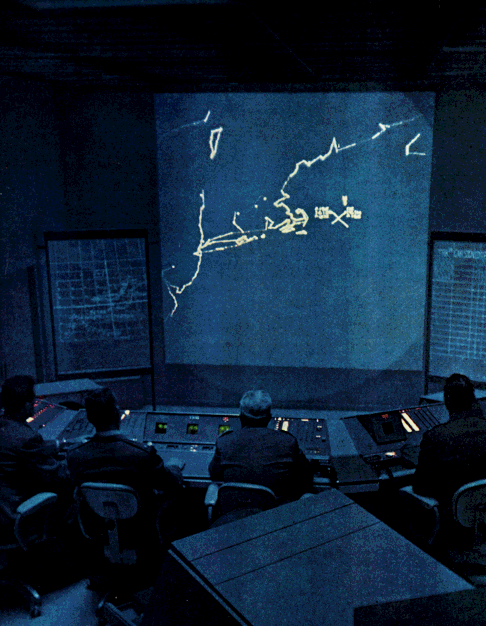
SAGE system for nuclear war—MITRE's first command and control project

In his book, Knight writes that the US military initially funded Chomsky's linguistics because they were interested in machine translation. Later their focus shifted and Knight cites Air Force Colonel Edmund Gaines’ statement that: "We sponsored linguistic research in order to learn how to build command and control systems that could understand English queries directly."

From 1963, Chomsky worked as a consultant to the MITRE Corporation, a military research institute set up by the US Air Force. According to one of Chomsky's former students, Barbara Partee, MITRE's justification for sponsoring Chomsky's approach to linguistics was "that in the event of a nuclear war, the generals would be underground with some computers trying to manage things, and that it would probably be easier to teach computers to understand English than to teach the generals to program."

Chomsky made his most detailed response to Knight in the 2019 book, The Responsibility of Intellectuals: Reflections by Noam Chomsky and others after 50 years. In this response, Chomsky dismissed Knight’s claims as a "vulgar exercise of defamation" and a "web of deceit and misinformation".
