= Labour Briefing =

British political magazine

Labour Briefing was a monthly political magazine produced by members of the British Labour Party.

== History and profile ==
The magazine began in 1980 as London Labour Briefing. The founders were the members of the Chartist Minority Tendency, which was a former Trotskyist part of the Chartist Collective. It was edited by (among others) Graham Bash, Chris Knight and Keith Veness and counted Ken Livingstone, Tony Benn and other prominent Labour councillors and MPs among its supporters. Throughout the early period, its masthead slogan was "Labour – take the power!" While the magazine's followers often acted as a political faction, its internal politics were non-sectarian and open, ranging from democratic socialist backers of the former Labour MP Tony Benn to some of the Trotskyist groups.

Jeremy Corbyn, later Leader of the Labour Party, became a regular contributor to London Labour Briefing in the 1980s, and was described by The Times in 1981 as "Briefing's founder". In a 1982 article published by The Economist, Corbyn was named as "Briefing's general secretary figure", as he also was in a profile on Corbyn compiled by parliamentary biographer Andrew Roth in 2004, which alleges that he joined the editorial board as General Secretary in 1979. Michael Crick, in the 2016 edition of his book Militant, says that Corbyn was "a member of the editorial board" in the "mid 1980s", as does Lansley, Goss and Wolmar's The Rise and Fall of the Municipal Left in 1989. The Times also said that Corbyn was still "closely linked" with the group in 1995. However, in 2017, Corbyn claimed these reports were inaccurate, telling Sky News presenter Sophy Ridge, "Andrew Roth has a wonderful reputation for having the most inaccurate parliamentary profiles known to anyone", and that "I read the magazine. I wrote for the magazine. I was not a member of the editorial board. I didn't agree with it."

The group campaigned for left-wing policies and greater democracy in the Labour Party, and focused on issues relating to municipal affairs. The paper also emphasised sexual and personal politics and anti-racism campaigns. London Labour Briefing was also prominent in supporting Irish republicanism and the UK miners' strike of 1984–1985. In due course, London Labour Briefing spawned local papers around Britain, such as Devon Labour Briefing. In July 1982, Corbyn argued against expulsions of Militant in Briefing.

Following the Brighton hotel bombing by the Provisional Irish Republican Army, the editorial board of London Labour Briefing said the bombings showed that "the British only sit up and take notice [of Ireland] when they are bombed into it". In December 1984, the magazine carried a reader's letter praising the "audacity" of the IRA attack and stating: "What do you call four dead Tories? A start." It mocked Norman Tebbit, the trade secretary who was dug out of the rubble of the Grand Hotel and whose wife was left permanently paralysed, saying: "Try riding your bike now, Norman" (in reference to an earlier speech made by Tebbit). The same issue carried a piece from the editorial board which "disassociated itself" from an article the previous month criticising the bombing, saying the criticism was a "serious political misjudgment".

Throughout the 1990s, Briefing lost supporters and influence as New Labour's hold over the Labour Party increased. Liz Davies was vetoed by Labour's National Executive Committee (NEC) as Labour's prospective parliamentary candidate for Leeds North East in 1995, in part for her association with Briefing. Corbyn called the decision of the NEC "totally unacceptable" at the time. In 1995, Central Books, a left-wing publisher which used to distribute the magazine, said: "It used to be wacky and even amusing. Now it's neo-Trotskyite rubbish."

London Labour Briefing was renamed Labour Briefing and was then known as Labour Left Briefing in 1995. In 2008, upon merging with Voice of the Unions, it reverted to Labour Briefing. It supports the Socialist Campaign Group of Members of Parliament, and aims to promote and build the network of local Campaign Groups.

== 2012 division ==
Following a contested vote at the July 2012 AGM, some supporters of Labour Briefing decided to transfer control of the magazine to the Labour Representation Committee. Other Editorial Board members, including Labour Party NEC member Christine Shawcroft, opposed the move, and continued to publish their own independent Labour Briefing magazine (sometimes known as 'Original Briefing').

In February 2023, the Labour Briefing Editorial Board announced the closure of the magazine.

== Contributors ==
There have been a number of notable contributors and members of the magazine's editorial board. Most contributors in the 1980s were prominent members of London's "outside left".

They included:

- Tony Banks
- Tony Benn
- Jeremy Corbyn, MP for Islington North, former Leader of the Labour Party
- Bryn Davies, trade unionist, actuary and politician who was Leader of the Inner London Education Authority in the early 1980s
- Andy Harris
- Tony Hart, Greater London Council member, and husband of Judith Hart MP
- Chris Knight, anthropologist
- Ted Knight, former Lambeth council leader
- George Nicholson
- Jackie Walker, activist
