= Thomas Klikauer =

Australian Senior lecturer

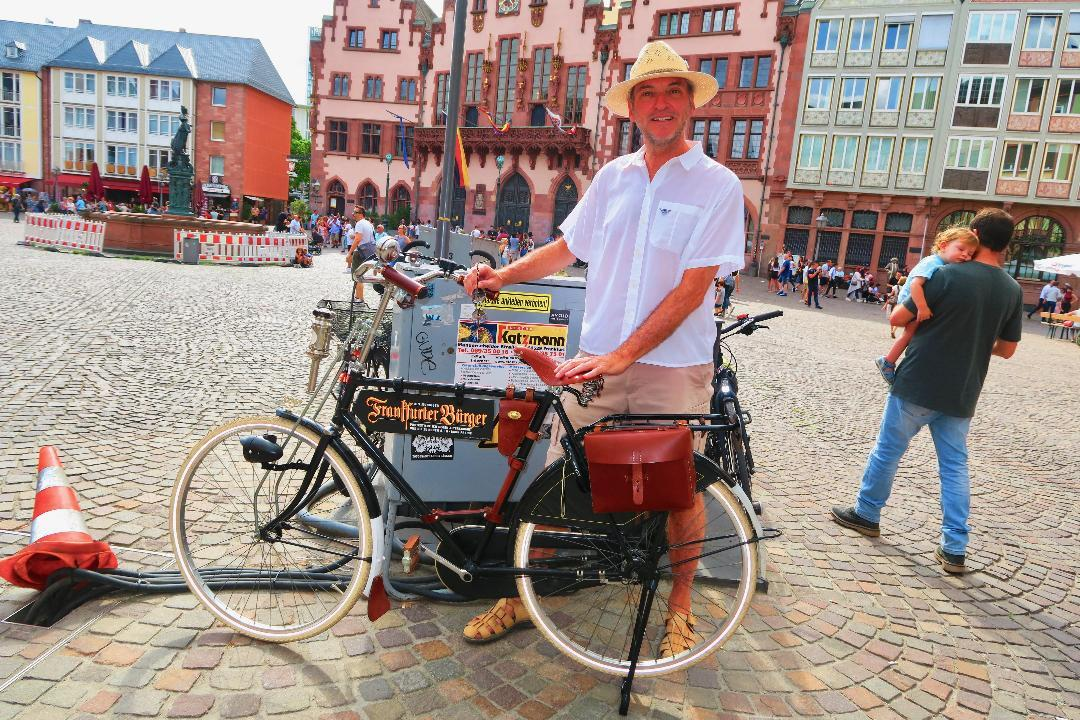
- Born: 20 July 1962 (age 62); Darmstadt
- Main interests: Moral philosophy; Ethics; Managerialism; Management Education
- Notable ideas: theoretical development of Managerialism; Application of Lawrence Kohlberg; moral theory to management

Thomas Klikauer (born 20 July 1962 in Darmstadt/ Germany) is a Senior lecturer teaching Human resource management and Industrial Relations at the Sydney Graduate School of Management (SGSM) at the Western Sydney University, Australia. He holds MAs from the United States and Germany and a PhD from Warwick University, UK. His research into the motor vehicle and shipping industry (e.g. ) led to several books focusing on Communication, and Management at Work, Management Communication, Communicative Ethics and Action. His current interest is in ethics at work and management. Thomas Klikauer is a leading authority on Managerialism.

== Education ==
Finishing elementary school, he entered into an apprenticeship to graduate with an engineering degree as toolmaker. Upon re-entering school, he graduated from The University of Applied Science in Darmstadt (BA) to move on to Technical University of Darmstadt and to Bremen University holding a master's degree in Political Science. He also holds a Master of Political Science from Boston University. He was awarded a PhD at the University of Warwick (UK) in Industrial and Business Studies.

== Publications ==
=== Books ===
- 2023. German Conspiracy Fantasies in the Time of the COVID-19 Pandemic, KDP
- 2023. The Language of Managerialism, Palgrave/Springer
- 2022. A Global Guide to HRM, London: Routledge
- 2021. Media Capitalism – Hegemony in the Age of Mass Deception, Palgrave
- 2020. Alternative für Deutschland – The AfD, Eastbourne: Sussex Academic Press
- 2018. Managing People in Organizations, Red Globe Press
- 2017. Management Education - Fragments of an Emancipatory Theory, Palgrave
- 2015. Hegel’s Moral Corporation, Basingstoke: Palgrave
- 2014. Seven HRM Moralities, Basingstoke: Palgrave.
- 2013. Managerialism – A Critique of an Ideology, Basingstoke: Palgrave.
- 2012. Seven Management Moralities, Basingstoke: Palgrave.
- 2010. Critical Management Ethics, Basingstoke: Palgrave.
- 2008. Management Communication, Basingstoke: Palgrave.
- 2007. Communication and Management at Work, Basingstoke: Palgrave.
