= Symbolic culture =

Concept in anthropology

Symbolic culture, or non-material culture, is the cultural realm constructed and inhabited uniquely by Homo sapiens and is differentiated from ordinary culture, which many other animals possess. Symbolic culture is studied by archaeologists, social anthropologists and sociologists. From 2018, however, some evidence of a Neanderthal origin of symbolic culture emerged.

Examples of symbolic culture include concepts (such as good and evil), mythical constructs (such as gods and underworlds), and social constructs (such as promises and football games).

== Evolutionary emergence ==
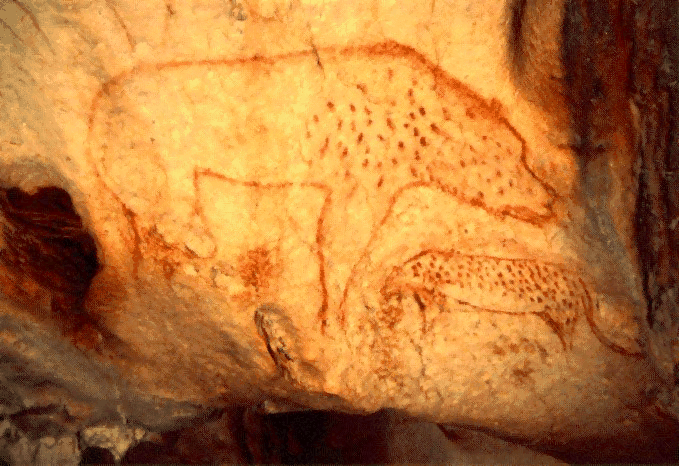
30,000-year-old cave hyena cave painting

It was once thought that art and symbolic culture first emerged in Europe some 40,000 years ago, during the Middle-to-Upper Palaeolithic transition – often termed the 'symbolic explosion' or 'Upper Palaeolithic revolution'. Some archaeologists still adhere to this view. Others now accept that symbolic culture probably emerged in sub-Saharan Africa at a much earlier date, during the period known as the Middle Stone Age. The evidence consists of traditions of ground ochre with strong selection for the colour red, examples of so-called ochre 'crayons' which appear to have been used for purposes of design, probably on the body, and geometric engravings on blocks of ochre. All this apparently formed part of a cosmetics industry dated to between 100,000 and 200,000 years ago. One theory is that this constitutes evidence for a ritual tradition. A bone apparently engraved with six lines from ~120 kya is one of the oldest deliberate abstract manifestations produced hominins. In addition, from about 100,000 years ago, there are pierced shells which appear to show signs of wear, suggesting that they were strung together to make necklaces. The controversial theory of female cosmetic coalitions interprets the ochre tradition as evidence that the world's first art, as an aspect of symbolic culture, took the form of personal ornamentation and body-painting. It was initially countered that pigment-only decorative systems are merely individualistic display, not necessarily indicative of ritual, whereas the bead traditions testify to language, institutionalised relationships and full-scale ritual and symbolic culture. More recently, however, those making this criticism have conceded that the evidence for ochre pigment use, stretching back towards 300,000 years ago, must indeed be recognised as the earliest durable media testifying to a collective ritual tradition. Meyocks (2026) has proposed that such symbolic capacities may have substantially deeper roots, arguing that 'cognitive crypsis'—the capacity for representational disguise developed for ambush hunting approximately one million years ago—established the cognitive architecture for later cosmetic traditions, suggesting that ochre body-painting represents a continuation of ancient predatory camouflage strategies rather than a sudden cultural innovation.

== See also ==
- Behavioral modernity
- Ochre
- Prehistoric art
- Blombos Cave
- Origins of society
- Timeline of evolution
- Cognitive revolution
