= Origins of society =

Theories of social origins

The origins of society — the evolutionary emergence of distinctively human social organization — is an important topic within evolutionary biology, anthropology, prehistory and palaeolithic archaeology. While little is known for certain, debates since Hobbes and Rousseau have returned again and again to the philosophical, moral and evolutionary questions posed.

== Social origins in nature ==
=== Origin of social groups ===
==== Thomas Hobbes ====
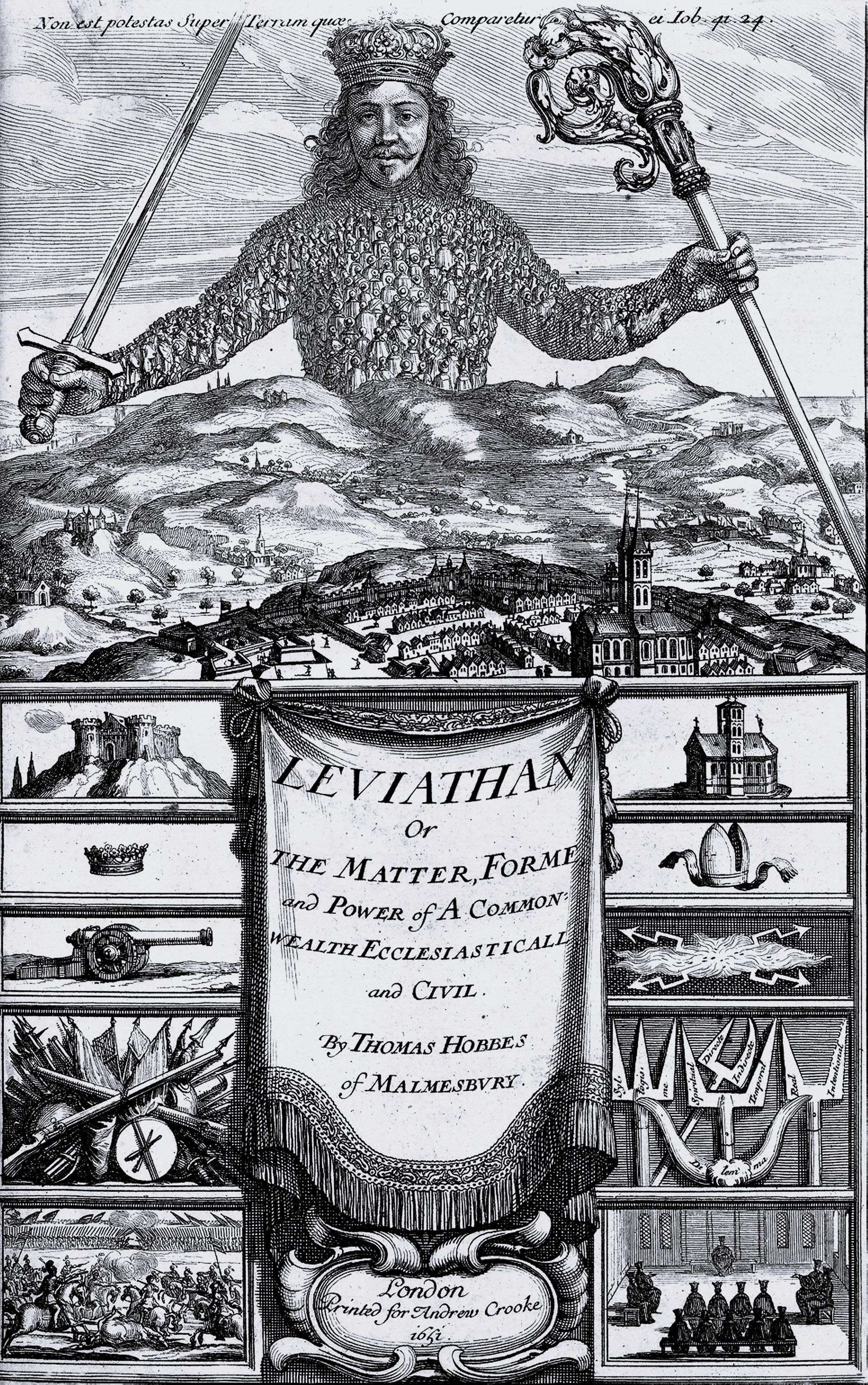
Frontispiece of "Leviathan," by Abraham Bosse, with input from Hobbes.

Arguably the most influential theory of human social origins is that of Thomas Hobbes, who in his Leviathan argued that without strong government, society would collapse into Bellum omnium contra omnes — "the war of all against all":

In such condition, there is no place for industry; because the fruit thereof is uncertain: and consequently no culture of the earth; no navigation, nor use of the commodities that may be imported by sea; no commodious building; no instruments of moving, and removing, such things as require much force; no knowledge of the face of the earth; no account of time; no arts; no letters; no society; and which is worst of all, continual fear, and danger of violent death; and the life of man, solitary, poor, nasty, brutish, and short.

— "Chapter XIII: Of the Natural Condition of Mankind As Concerning Their Felicity, and Misery.", Leviathan

Hobbes' innovation was to attribute the establishment of society to a founding 'social contract', in which the Crown's subjects surrender some part of their freedom in return for security.

If Hobbes' idea is accepted, it follows that society could not have emerged prior to the state. This school of thought has remained influential to this day. Prominent in this respect is British archaeologist Colin Renfrew (Baron Renfrew of Kaimsthorn), who points out that the state did not emerge until long after the evolution of Homo sapiens. The earliest representatives of our species, according to Renfrew, may well have been anatomically modern, but they were not yet cognitively or behaviourally modern. For example, they lacked political leadership, large-scale cooperation, food production, organised religion, law or symbolic artefacts. Humans were simply hunter-gatherers, who — much like extant apes — ate whatever food they could find in the vicinity. Renfrew controversially suggests that hunter-gatherers to this day think and socialise along lines not radically different from those of their nonhuman primate counterparts. In particular, he says that they do not "ascribe symbolic meaning to material objects" and for that reason "lack fully developed 'mind.'"

However, hunter-gatherer ethnographers emphasise that extant foraging peoples certainly do have social institutions — notably institutionalised rights and duties codified in formal systems of kinship. Elaborate rituals such as initiation ceremonies serve to cement contracts and commitments, quite independently of the state. Other scholars would add that insofar as we can speak of "human revolutions" — "major transitions" in human evolution — the first was not the Neolithic Revolution but the rise of symbolic culture that occurred toward the end of the Middle Stone Age.

Arguing the exact opposite of Hobbes's position, anarchist anthropologist Pierre Clastres views the state and society as mutually incompatible: genuine society is always struggling to survive against the state.

==== Jean-Jacques Rousseau ====
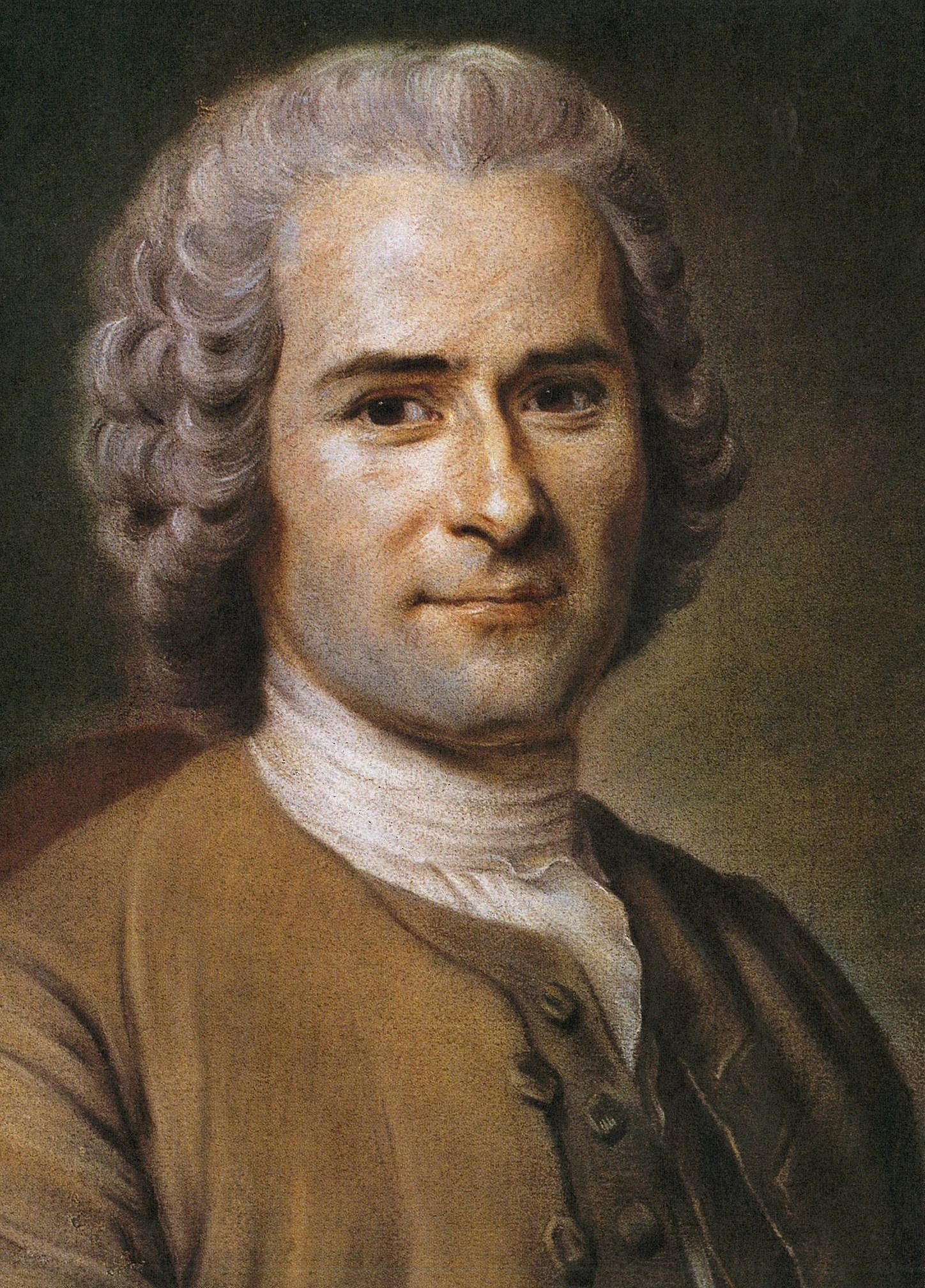
Rousseau in 1753

Like Hobbes, Jean-Jacques Rousseau argued that society was born in a social contract. In Rousseau's case, however, sovereignty is vested in the entire populace, who enter into the contract directly with one another. "The problem", he explained, "is to find a form of association which will defend and protect with the whole common force the person and goods of each associate, and in which each, while uniting himself with all, may still obey himself alone, and remain as free as before." This is the fundamental problem of which the Social Contract provides the solution. The contract's clauses, Rousseau continued, may be reduced to one — "the total alienation of each associate, together with all his rights, to the whole community. Each man, in giving himself to all, gives himself to nobody; and as there is no associate over whom he does not acquire the same right as he yields others over himself, he gains an equivalent for everything he loses, and an increase of force for the preservation of what he has".

In other words: "Each of us puts his person and all his power in common under the supreme direction of the general will, and, in our corporate capacity, we receive each member as an indivisible part of the whole." At once, in place of the individual personality of each contracting party, this act of association creates a moral and collective body, composed of as many members as the assembly contains votes, and receiving from this act its unity, its common identity, its life and its will. By this means, each member of the community acquires not only the capacities of the whole but also, for the first time, rational mentality:

The passage from the state of nature to the civil state produces a very remarkable change in man, by substituting justice for instinct in his conduct, and giving his actions the morality they had formerly lacked. Then only, when the voice of duty takes the place of physical impulses and right of appetite, does man, who so far had considered only himself, find that he is forced to act on different principles, and to consult his reason before listening to his inclinations.

— Jean-Jacques Rousseau, The Social Contract and Discourses. Trans. G. D. H. Cole. New edition. London & Melbourne: Dent. Book I Ch. 8.

==== Sir Henry Sumner Maine ====
In his influential book, Ancient Law (1861), Maine argued that in early times, the basic unit of human social organisation was the patriarchal family:

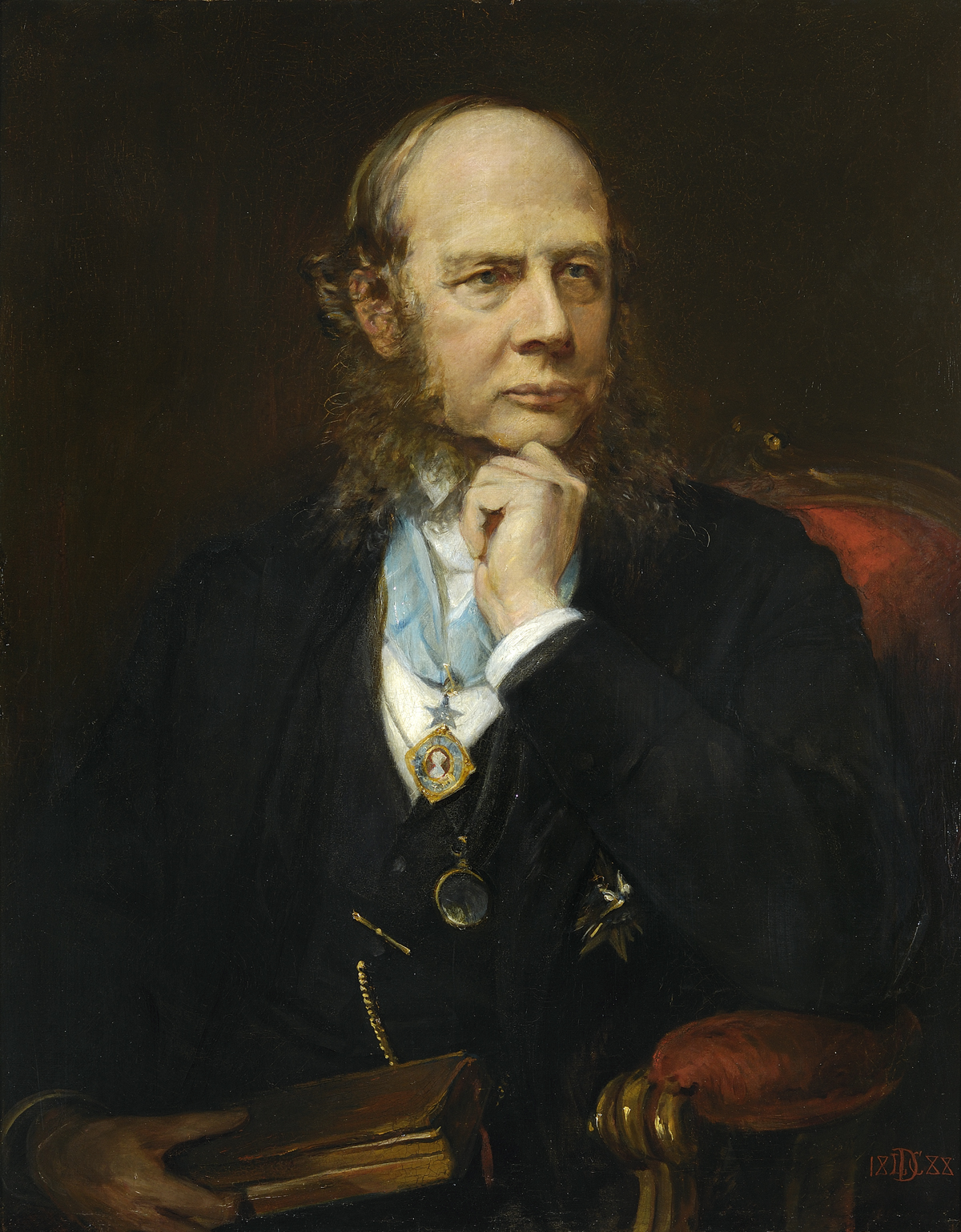
Sir Henry James Sumner Maine

The effect of the evidence derived from comparative jurisprudence is to establish the view of the primeval condition of the human race which is known as the Patriarchal Theory.

— Maine, H. S. 1861. Ancient Law. London: John Murray. p. 122.

Hostile to French revolutionary and other radical social ideas, Maine's motives were partly political. He sought to undermine the legacy of Rousseau and other advocates of man's natural rights by asserting that originally, no one had any rights at all – ‘every man, living during the greater part of his life under the patriarchal despotism, was practically controlled in all his actions by a regimen not of law but of caprice’. Not only were the patriarch's children subject to what Maine calls his ‘despotism’: his wife and his slaves were equally affected. The very notion of kinship, according to Maine, was simply a way of categorizing those who were forcibly subjected to the despot's arbitrary rule. Maine later added a Darwinian strand to this argument. In his The Descent of Man, Darwin had cited reports that a wild-living male gorilla would monopolise for itself as large a harem of females as it could violently defend. Maine endorsed Darwin's speculation that ‘primeval man’ probably 'lived in small communities, each with as many wives as he could support and obtain, whom he would have jealously guarded against all other men’. Under pressure to spell out exactly what he meant by the term 'patriarchy', Maine clarified that ‘sexual jealousy, indulged through power, might serve as a definition of the Patriarchal Family’.

==== Lewis Henry Morgan ====
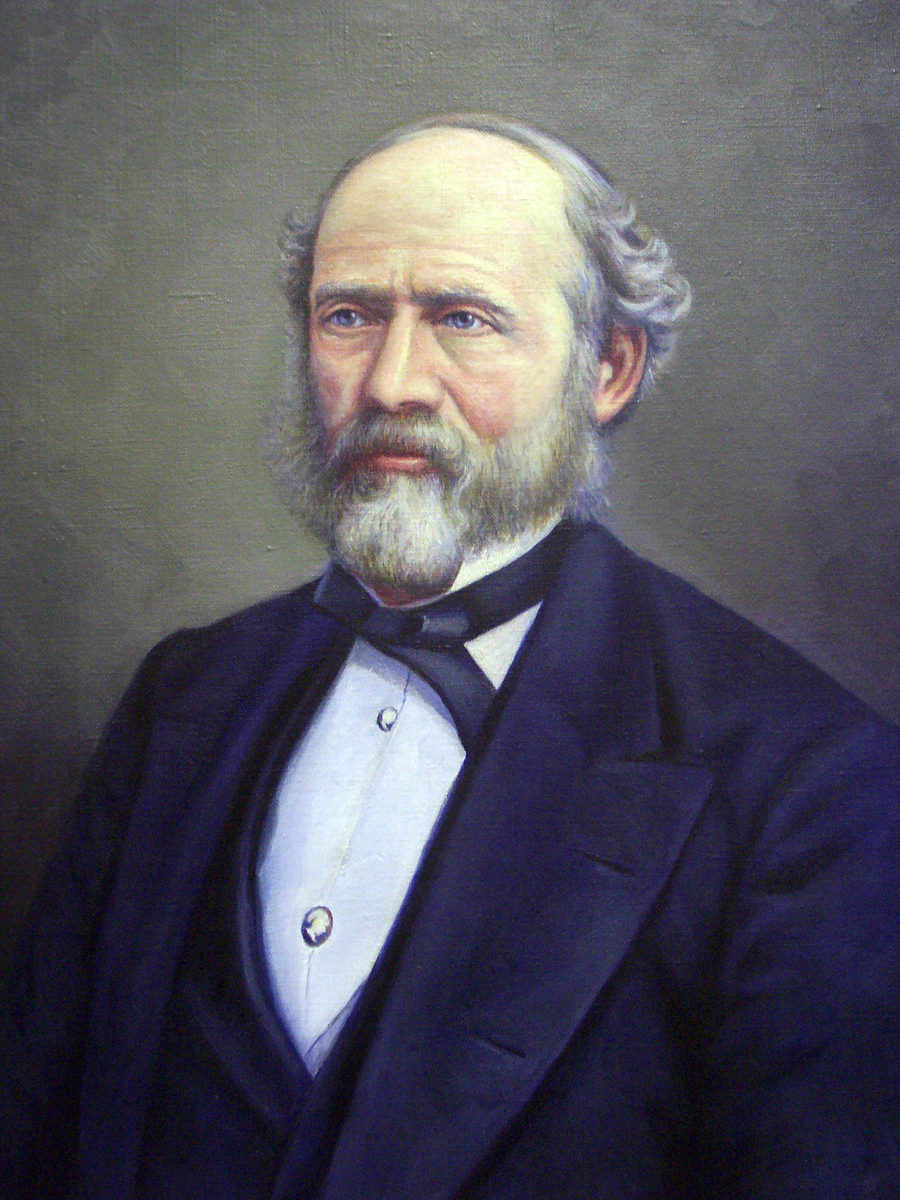
Lewis H. Morgan

In his influential book, Ancient Society (1877), its title echoing Maine's Ancient Law, Lewis Henry Morgan proposed a very different theory. Morgan insisted that throughout the earlier periods of human history, neither the state nor the family existed.

It may be here premised that all forms of government are reducible to two general plans, using the word plan in its scientific sense. In their bases the two are fundamentally distinct. The first, in the order of time, is founded upon persons, and upon relations purely personal, and may be distinguished as a society (societas). The gens is the unit of this organization; giving as the successive stages of integration, in the archaic period, the gens, the phratry, the tribe, and the confederacy of tribes, which constituted a people or nation (populus). At a later period a coalescence of tribes in the same area into a nation took the place of a confederacy of tribes occupying independent areas. Such, through prolonged ages, after the gens appeared, was the substantially universal organization of ancient society; and it remained among the Greeks and Romans after civilization supervened. The second is founded upon territory and upon property, and may be distinguished as a state (civitas).

— Morgan, L. H. 1877. Ancient Society. Chicago: Charles H. Kerr, p. 6.

In place of both family and state, according to Morgan, was the gens — nowadays termed the 'clan' — based initially on matrilocal residence and matrilineal descent This aspect of Morgan's theory, later endorsed by Karl Marx and Frederick Engels, is nowadays widely considered discredited (but for a critical survey of the current consensus, see Knight 2008, 'Early Human Kinship Was Matrilineal').

==== Friedrich Engels ====
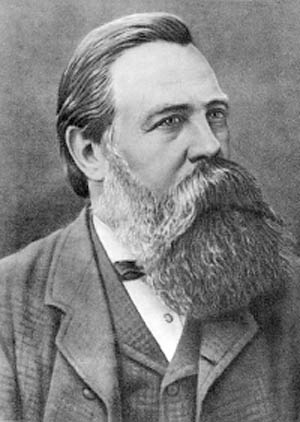
Friedrich Engels

Friedrich Engels built on Morgan's ideas in his 1884 essay, The Origin of the Family, Private Property and the State in the light of the researches of Lewis Henry Morgan. His primary interest was the position of women in early society, and — in particular — Morgan's insistence that the matrilineal clan preceded the family as society's fundamental unit. 'The mother-right gens', wrote Engels in his survey of contemporary historical materialist scholarship, 'has become the pivot around which the entire science turns...' Engels argued that the matrilineal clan represented a principle of self-organization so vibrant and effective that it allowed no room for patriarchal dominance or the territorial state.

The first class antagonism which appears in human history coincides with the development of the antagonism between man and woman in monogamian marriage, and the first class oppression with that of the female sex by the male.

— Engels, F. 1940 [1884] The origin of the family, private property and the state. London: Lawrence and Wishart.

==== Emile Durkheim ====
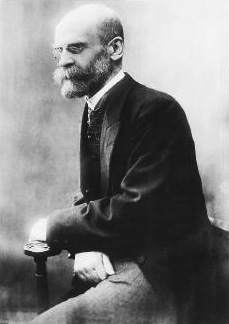
Émile Durkheim

Emile Durkheim considered that in order to exist, any human social system must counteract the natural tendency for the sexes to promiscuously conjoin. He argued that social order presupposes sexual morality, which is expressed in prohibitions against sex with certain people or during certain periods — in traditional societies particularly during menstruation.

One first fact is certain: that is, that the entire system of prohibitions must strictly conform to the ideas that primitive man had about menstruation and about menstrual blood. For all these taboos start only with the onset of puberty: and it is only when the first signs of blood appear that they reach their maximum rigour.

— Durkheim, E. 1963 [1898]. La prohibition de l'inceste et ses origines. L'Année Sociologique 1: 1–70. Reprinted as Incest. The nature and origin of the taboo, trans. E. Sagarin. New York: Stuart, p. 81.

The incest taboo, wrote Durkheim in 1898, is no more than a particular example of something more basic and universal - the ritualistic setting apart of 'the sacred' from 'the profane'. This begins as the segregation of the sexes, each of which - at least on important occasions - is 'sacred' or 'set apart' from the other. 'The two sexes', as Durkheim explains, 'must avoid each other with the same care as the profane flees from the sacred and the sacred from the profane.' Women as sisters act out the role of 'sacred' beings invested 'with an isolating power of some sort, a power which holds the masculine population at a distance.' Their menstrual blood in particular sets them in a category apart, exercising a 'type of repulsing action which keeps the other sex far from them'. In this way, the earliest ritual structure emerges — establishing morally regulated 'society' for the first time.

==== Sigmund Freud ====
Charles Darwin pictured early human society as resembling that of apes, with one or more dominant males jealously guarding a harem of females. In his myth of the 'Primal Horde', Sigmund Freud later took all this as his starting point but then postulated an insurrection mounted by the tyrant's own sons:

All that we find there is a violent and jealous father who keeps all the females for himself and drives away his sons as they grow up…. One day the brothers who had been driven out came together, killed and devoured their father and so made an end of the patriarchal horde.

— Freud, S. 1965 [1913]. Totem and Taboo. London: Routledge, p. 141.

Following this, the band of brothers were about to take sexual possession of their mothers and sisters when suddenly they were overcome with remorse. In their contradictory emotional state, their dead father now became stronger than the living one had been. In memory of him, the brothers revoked their deed by forbidding the killing and eating of the 'totem' (as their father had now become) and renouncing their claim to the women who had just been set free. In this way, the two fundamental taboos of primitive society – not to eat the totem and not to marry one's sisters – were established for the first time.

==== Marshall Sahlins ====
A related but less dramatic version of Freud's 'sexual revolution' idea was proposed in 1960 by American social anthropologist Marshall Sahlins. Somehow, he writes, the world of primate brute competition and sexual dominance was turned upside-down:

The decisive battle between early culture and human nature must have been waged on the field of primate sexuality…. Among subhuman primates sex had organized society; the customs of hunters and gatherers testify eloquently that now society was to organize sex…. In selective adaptation to the perils of the Stone Age, human society overcame or subordinated such primate propensities as selfishness, indiscriminate sexuality, dominance and brute competition. It substituted kinship and co-operation for conflict, placed solidarity over sex, morality over might. In its earliest days it accomplished the greatest reform in history, the overthrow of human primate nature, and thereby secured the evolutionary future of the species.

— Sahlins, M. D. 1960 The origin of society. Scientific American 203(3): 76–87.

==== Christopher Boehm ====
Once a prehistoric hunting band institutionalized a successful and decisive rebellion, and did away with the alpha-male role permanently... it is easy to see how this institution would have spread.

— Boehm, C. 2000. Journal of Consciousness Studies 7, 1–2 pp. 79–101; p. 97.

If we accept Rousseau's line of reasoning, no single dominant individual is needed to embody society, to guarantee security, or to enforce social contracts. The people themselves can do these things, combining to enforce the general will. A modern origins theory along these lines is that of evolutionary anthropologist Christopher Boehm. Boehm argues that ape social organisation tends to be despotic, typically with one or more dominant males monopolising access to the locally available females. But wherever there is dominance, we can also expect resistance. In the human case, resistance to being personally dominated intensified as humans used their social intelligence to form coalitions. Eventually, a point was reached when the costs of attempting to impose dominance became so high that the strategy was no longer evolutionarily stable, whereupon social life tipped over into 'reverse dominance' — defined as a situation in which only the entire community, on guard against primate-style individual dominance, is permitted to use force to suppress deviant behaviour.

==== Ernest Gellner ====
Human beings, writes social anthropologist Ernest Gellner, are not genetically programmed to be members of this or that social order. You can take a human infant and place it into any kind of social order and it will function acceptably. What makes human society so distinctive is the fabulous range of quite different forms it takes across the world. Yet in any given society, the range of permitted behaviours is quite narrowly constrained. This is not owing to the existence of any externally imposed system of rewards and punishments. The constraints come from within — from certain compulsive moral concepts which members of the social order have internalised. The society installs these concepts in each individual's psyche in the manner first identified by Emile Durkheim, namely, by means of collective rituals such as initiation rites. Therefore, the problem of the origins of society boils down to the problem of the origins of collective ritual.

How is a society established, and a series of societies diversified, whilst each of them is restrained from chaotically exploiting that wide diversity of possible human behaviour? A theory is available concerning how this may be done and it is one of the basic theories of social anthropology. The way in which you restrain people from doing a wide variety of things, not compatible with the social order of which they are members, is that you subject them to ritual. The process is simple: you make them dance around a totem pole until they are wild with excitement, and become jellies in the hysteria of collective frenzy; you enhance their emotional state by any device, by all the locally available audio-visual aids, drugs, music and so on; and once they are really high, you stamp upon their minds the type of concept or notion to which they subsequently become enslaved.

— Gellner, E. 1988. Origins of Society. In A. C. Fabian (ed.), Origins. The Darwin College Lectures. Cambridge: Cambridge University Press, pp.128–140; p. 130.

=== Gender and origins ===
Feminist scholars — among them palaeoanthropologists Leslie Aiello and Camilla Power — take similar arguments a step further, arguing that any reform or revolution which overthrew male dominance must have been led by women. Evolving human females, Power and Aiello suggest, actively separated themselves from males on a periodic basis, using their own blood (and/or pigments such as red ochre) to mark themselves as fertile and defiant:

The sexual division of labor entails differentiation of roles in food procurement, with logistic hunting of large game by males, co-operation and exchange of products. Our hypothesis is that symbolism arose in this context. To minimize energetic costs of travel, coalitions of women began to invest in home bases. To secure this strategy, women would have to use their attractive, collective signal of impending fertility in a wholly new way: by signalling refusal of sexual access except to males who returned "home" with provisions. Menstruation — real or artificial — while biologically the wrong time for fertile sex, is psychologically the right moment for focusing men's minds on imminent hunting, since it offers the prospect of fertile sex in the near future.

— Power, C. and L. C. Aiello 1997. Female proto-symbolic strategies. In L. D. Hager (ed.), Women in Human Evolution. New York and London: Routledge, pp. 153–171; p. 159.

In similar vein, anthropologist Chris Knight argues that Boehm's idea of a 'coalition of everyone' is hard to envisage, unless — along the lines of a modern industrial picket line — it was formed to co-ordinate 'sex-strike' action against badly behaving males:

....male dominance had to be overthrown because the unending prioritising of male short-term sexual interests could lead only to the permanence and institutionalisation of behavioural conflict between the sexes, between the generations and also between rival males. If the symbolic, cultural domain was to emerge, what was needed was a political collectivity — an alliance — capable of transcending such conflicts. ... Only the consistent defence and self-defence of mothers with their offspring could produce a collectivity embodying interests of a sufficiently broad, universalistic kind.

— Knight, C. 1991. Blood Relations. Menstruation and the origins of culture. New Haven and London: Yale University Press, p. 514

In virtually all hunter-gatherer ethnographies, according to Knight, a persistent theme is that 'women like meat', and that they determinedly use their collective bargaining power to motivate men to hunt for them and bring home their kills — on pain of exclusion from sex. Arguments about women's crucial role in domesticating males — motivating them to cooperate — have also been advanced by anthropologists Kristen Hawkes, Sarah Hrdy and Bruce Knauft among others. Meanwhile, other evolutionary scientists continue to envisage uninterrupted male dominance, continuity with primate social systems and the emergence of society on a gradualist basis without revolutionary leaps.

== Sociobiological theories ==
=== Robert Trivers ===
I consider Trivers one of the great thinkers in the history of Western thought. It would not be too much of an exaggeration to say that he has provided a scientific explanation for the human condition: the intricately complicated and endlessly fascinating relationships that bind us to one another.

— Steven Pinker on Robert Trivers

In his 1985 book, Social Evolution, Robert Trivers outlines the theoretical framework used today by most evolutionary biologists to understand how and why societies are established. Trivers sets out from the fundamental fact that genes survive beyond the death of the bodies they inhabit, because copies of the same gene may be replicated in multiple different bodies. From this, it follows that a creature should behave altruistically to the extent that those benefiting carry the same genes — 'inclusive fitness', as this source of cooperation in nature is termed. Where animals are unrelated, cooperation should be limited to 'reciprocal altruism' or 'tit-for-tat'. Where previously, biologists took parent-offspring cooperation for granted, Trivers predicted on theoretical grounds both cooperation and conflict — as when a mother needs to wean an existing baby (even against its will) in order to make way for another. Previously, biologists had interpreted male infanticidal behaviour as aberrant and inexplicable or, alternatively, as a necessary strategy for culling excess population. Trivers was able to show that such behaviour was a logical strategy by males to enhance their own reproductive success at the expense of conspecifics including rival males. Ape or monkey females whose babies are threatened have directly opposed interests, often forming coalitions to defend themselves and their offspring against infanticidal males.

Human society, according to Trivers, is unusual in that it involves the male of the species investing parental care in his own offspring — a rare pattern for a primate. Where such cooperation occurs, it's not enough to take it for granted: in Trivers' view we need to explain it using an overarching theoretical framework applicable to humans and nonhumans alike.

Everybody has a social life. All living creatures reproduce and reproduction is a social event, since at its bare minimum it involves the genetic and material construction of one individual by another. In turn, differences between individuals in the number of their surviving offspring (natural selection) is the driving force behind organic evolution. Life is intrinsically social and it evolves through a process of natural selection which is itself social. For these reasons social evolution refers not only to the evolution of social relationships between individuals but also to deeper themes of biological organization stretching from gene to community.

— Robert Trivers, 1985. Social Evolution. Menlo Park, California: Benjamin/Cummings, p. vii.

=== Robin Dunbar ===
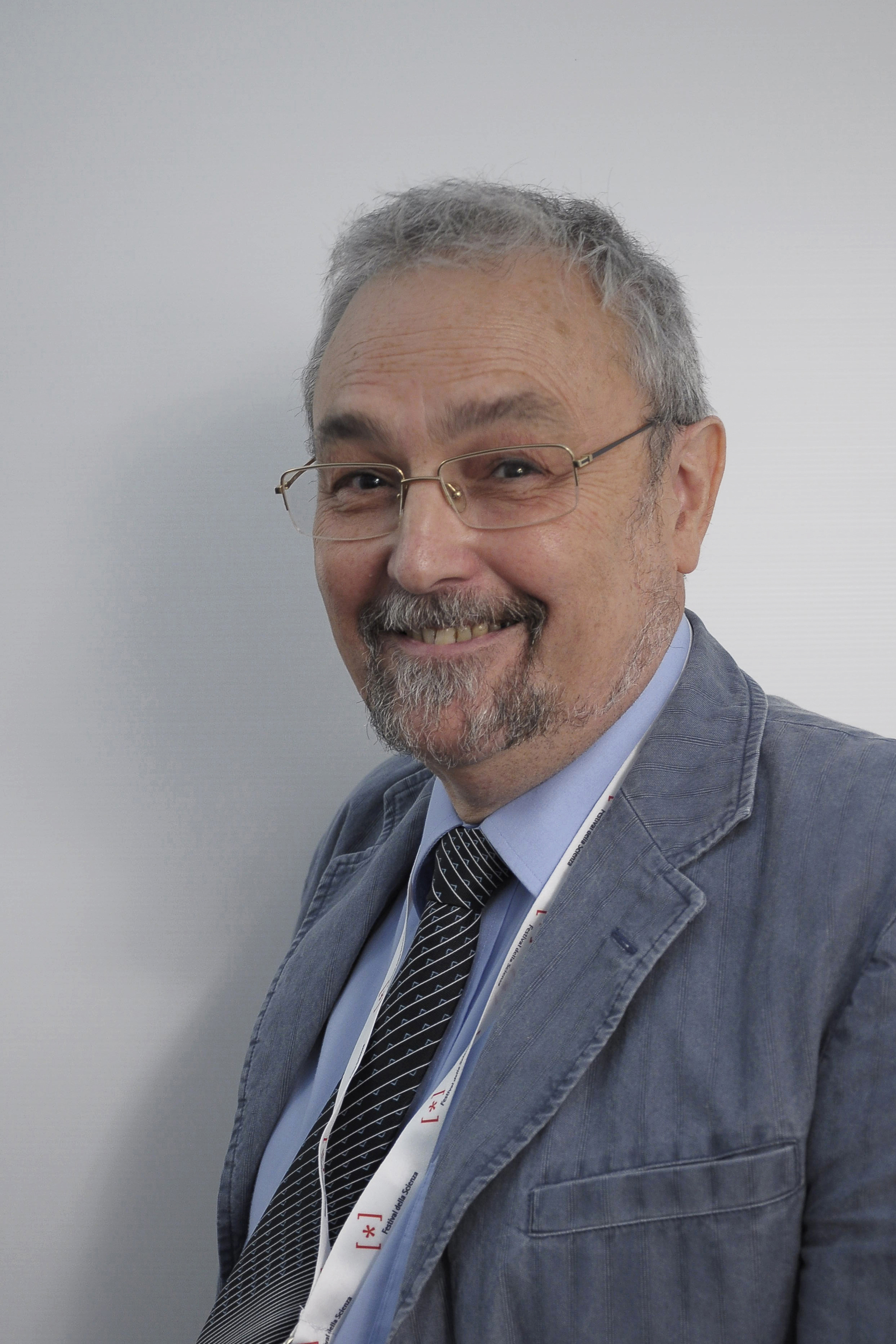
Robin Dunbar

Robin Dunbar originally studied gelada baboons in the wild in Ethiopia, and has done much to synthesise modern primatological knowledge with Darwinian theory into a comprehensive overall picture. The components of primate social systems 'are essentially alliances of a political nature aimed at enabling the animals concerned to achieve more effective solutions to particular problems of survival and reproduction'. Primate societies are in essence 'multi-layered sets of coalitions'. Although physical fights are ultimately decisive, the social mobilisation of allies usually decides matters and requires skills that go beyond mere fighting ability. The manipulation and use of coalitions demands sophisticated social — more precisely political — intelligence. Usually but not always, males exercise dominance over females. Even where male despotism prevails, females typically gang up with one another to pursue agendas of their own. When a male gelada baboon attacks a previously dominant rival so as to take over his harem, the females concerned may insist on their own say in the outcome. At various stages during the fighting, the females may 'vote' among themselves on whether to accept the provisional outcome. Rejection is signalled by refusing to groom the challenger; acceptance is signalled by going up to him and grooming him. According to Dunbar, the ultimate outcome of an inter-male 'sexual fight' always depends on the female 'vote'.

Dunbar points out that in a primate social system, lower-ranking females will typically suffer the most intense harassment. Consequently, they will be the first to form coalitions in self-defence. But maintaining commitment from coalition allies involves much time-consuming manual grooming, putting pressure on time-budgets. In the case of evolving humans, who were living in increasingly large groups, the costs would soon have outweighed the benefits — unless some more efficient way of maintaining relationships could be found. Dunbar argues that 'vocal grooming' — using the voice to signal commitment — was the time-saving solution adopted, and that this led eventually to speech. Dunbar goes on to suggest (citing evolutionary anthropologist Chris Knight) that distinctively human society may have been evolved under pressure from female ritual and 'gossiping' coalitions established to dissuade males from fighting one another and instead cooperate in hunting for the benefit of the whole camp:

If females formed the core of these early groups, and language evolved to bond these groups, it naturally follows that the early human females were the first to speak. This reinforces the suggestion that language was first used to create a sense of emotional solidarity between allies. Chris Knight has argued a passionate case for the idea that language first evolved to allow the females in these early groups to band together to force males to invest in them and their offspring, principally by hunting for meat. This would be consistent with the fact that, among modern humans, women are generally better at verbal skills than men, as well as being more skilful in the social domain.

— Dunbar, R. I. M. 1996. Grooming, Gossip and the Evolution of Language. London: Faber and Faber, p. 149.

Dunbar stresses that this is currently a minority theory among specialists in human origins — most still support the 'bison-down-at-the-lake' theory attributing early language and cooperation to the imperatives of men's activities such as hunting. Despite this, he argues that 'female bonding may have been a more powerful force in human evolution than is sometimes supposed'. Although still controversial, the idea that female coalitions may have played a decisive role has subsequently received strong support from a number of anthropologists including Sarah Hrdy, Camilla Power, Ian Watts. and Jerome Lewis. It is also consistent with recent studies by population geneticists (see Verdu et al. 2013 for Central African Pygmies; Schlebusch 2010 for Khoisan) showing a deep-time tendency to matrilocality among African hunter-gatherers.

== See also ==
- Behavioral modernity
- Generative anthropology
- Origin of speech
- Origin of language
- Sociocultural evolution
