= Chris Knight (anthropologist) =

British anthropologist and activist

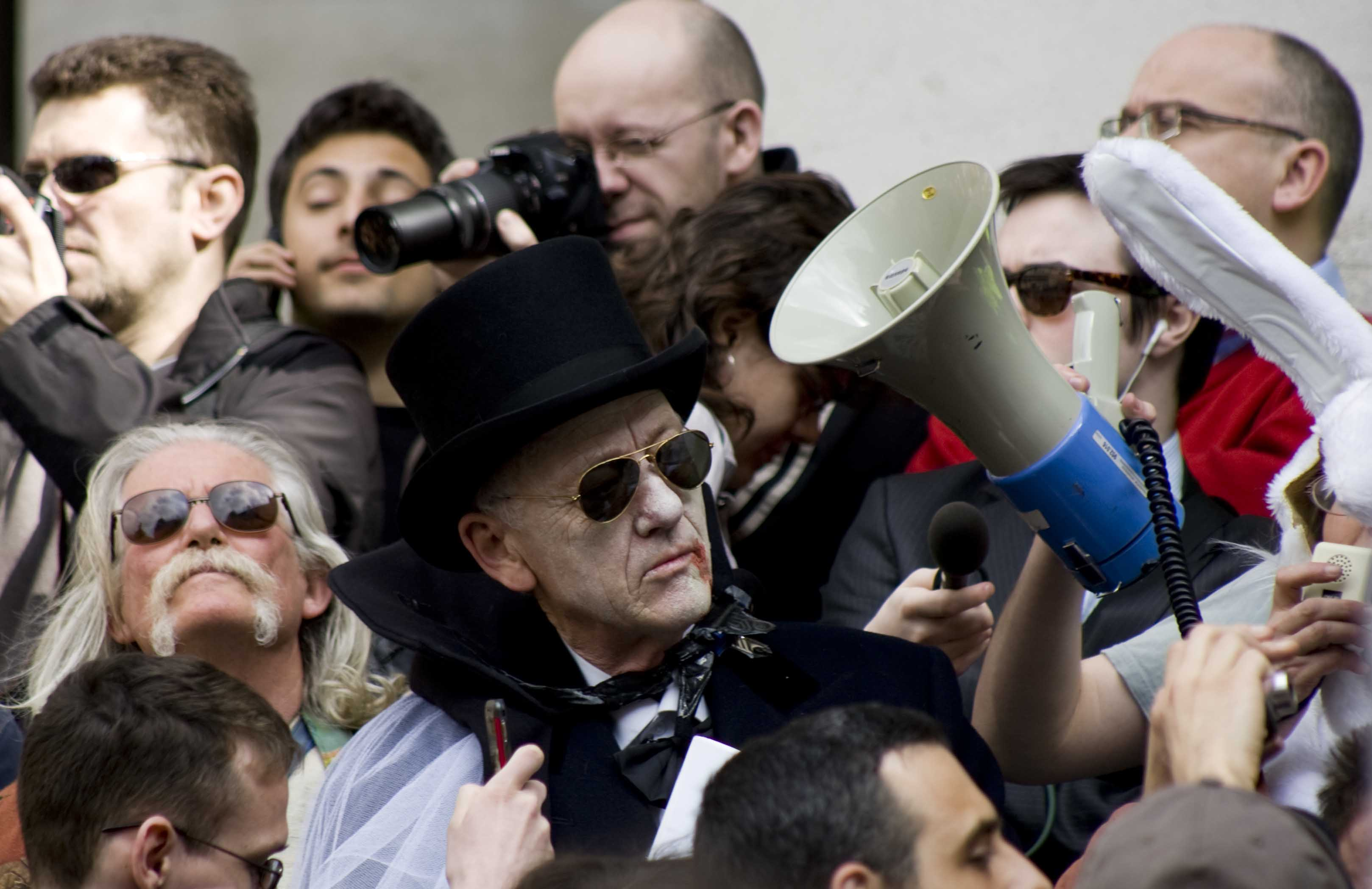
- Chris Knight at the G20 Meltdown protest in 2009
- Born: 1942 (age 83–84)
- Education: University of London
- Occupations: Author; Anthropologist
- Notable work: Blood Relations: Menstruation and the Origins of Culture (1991) Decoding Chomsky: Science and Revolutionary Politics (2016) The Revolutionary Origins of Language (with Jerome Lewis) (2026)
- Website: chrisknight.co.uk

Chris Knight (born 1942) is a British anthropologist author, and political activist. He completed his PhD at the University of London on the work of Claude Lévi-Strauss and became a professor of anthropology at the University of East London, and is currently a senior research fellow at University College London. He is known for his "platform of trust" perspective on evolutionary linguistics. He has authored several books, including Blood Relations: Menstruation and the Origins of Culture (1991), which explores the role of female solidarity in the origins of human culture, and Decoding Chomsky: Science and Revolutionary Politics (2016), a sociological critique of Noam Chomsky's linguistics and political activism. His most recent book, co-authored with Jerome Lewis, is The Revolutionary Origins of Language (2026). He founded and in the early years edited the journal Labour Briefing.

== Life ==
=== Professional ===
Following an MPhil in Russian Literature from the University of Sussex in 1975, Knight gained his PhD in 1987 at the University of London for a thesis on Claude Lévi-Strauss's four-volume Mythologiques. He became a lecturer in anthropology at the University of East London in 1991 and a professor at the same institution in 2000. A founding member of the "Radical Anthropology Group" (RAG), Knight is currently a senior research fellow in the Department of Anthropology, University College London.

Since graduating from the University of Sussex in 1966, Knight has been exploring the idea that language emerged in the human species through a process of incremental Darwinian evolution culminating at a certain point in revolutionary change. Becoming human was, from this perspective, a classic instance of a dialectical process, i.e. one in which quantitative change culminates eventually in a qualitative leap. In pursuing this line of thought, Knight takes inspiration not only from modern Darwinian theorists such as Eörs Szathmáry and John Maynard Smith but also from Karl Marx and Friedrich Engels, who in their later years were fascinated by what was then the new science of anthropology.

In 1996, working with Professor James Hurford, Knight co-founded the EVOLANG series of international conferences on the origins of language, since when he has become a prominent figure in debates on this topic.

"The 'special' nature of human words has been well captured by Chris Knight in a series of works. By being truly symbolic, words are 'patently false signals.' As Knight observes, 'linguistic utterances are symbolic to the extent that they are patent falsehoods serving as guides to communicative intentions'. They are communicatively useful untruths, as it were. The reason words could be that way is, as Knight insightfully remarks, largely down to a matter of trust."

— Cedric Boeckx, Department of General Linguistics, University of Barcelona.

Knight's central insight – that the evolutionary emergence of language in Homo sapiens presupposed unprecedented levels of community-wide trust – has led to the establishment of a distinctive EVOLANG school. Sometimes identified as 'the platform of trust' perspective, scientists in this intellectual tradition include robotics engineer and pioneer in artificial intelligence Luc Steels, evolutionary linguists Sławomir Wacewicz and Przemysław Żywiczyński and the theoretical linguist and specialist in Chomsky's Minimalist approach to syntax Cedric Boeckx. In recognition of his contribution to evolutionary linguistics, Knight was awarded the Evolutionary Linguistics Association's Lifetime Achievement Award at an event held in Vienna in April 2014.

== Selected works ==
=== Blood Relations: Menstruation and the Origins of Culture ===
Published in 1991, Knight's first full-length book, Blood Relations: Menstruation and the origins of culture was favourably reviewed in The Times Higher Education Supplement, The Times Literary Supplement and The London Review of Books; it also received publicity through an interview on the BBC World Service Science Now programme.

=== Decoding Chomsky: Science and Revolutionary Politics ===
Knight's more recent book, Decoding Chomsky, is a sustained exploration of Noam Chomsky's approach to science and its relationship to politics.

The book's publication in October 2016 sparked instant public controversy. A reviewer for the US The Chronicle of Higher Education hailed it as perhaps 'the most in-depth meditation on "the Chomsky problem" ever published', recommending it as 'a compelling read'. In Britain, The New Scientist described Knight's controversial account as 'trenchant and compelling.'

Chomsky responded dismissively to Knight's book in both The New York Times and The London Review of Books. Linguists Norbert Hornstein and Frederick Newmeyer have also argued that Knight misrepresents Chomsky's views and have rejected his thesis about the motivation behind Chomsky's approach to linguistics.

=== Other books ===
- (ed. with R. Dunbar and C. Power) The Evolution of Culture. Edinburgh: Edinburgh University Press, 1999. ISBN 0-7486-1076-6.
- (ed. with J. R. Hurford and M. Studdert-Kennedy) Approaches to the Evolution of Language: Social and cognitive bases. Cambridge: Cambridge University Press, 1998. ISBN 978-0-52-163964-4
- (ed. with M. Studdert-Kennedy and J. R. Hurford) The Evolutionary Emergence of Language. Cambridge: Cambridge University Press, 2000. ISBN 0-521-78157-4.
- (ed. with R. Botha) The Prehistory of Language. Oxford: Oxford University Press, 2009. ISBN 978-0-19-954587-2.
- (ed. with R. Botha) The Cradle of Language. Oxford: Oxford University Press, 2009. ISBN 978-0-19-954585-8
- (ed. with D. Dor and J. Lewis) The Social Origins of Language. Oxford: Oxford University Press, 2014. ISBN 978-0-19-966533-4
- (ed. with N. Allott and Neil Smith) The Responsibility of Intellectuals. Reflections by Noam Chomsky and others after 50 years. London: University College Press, 2019. ISBN 978-1-78-735551-4

== Activism ==
Initially a supporter of the Militant tendency in the Labour Party, Chris Knight was later a founder editor of the journal Labour Briefing (he remains on the board) and has a long record of political activism. Although sometimes described as an anarchist, Knight defines himself intellectually as working within the tradition of Marxism.

During the 1984–1985 miners' strike, Knight was involved in setting up a group called Pit Dragon with the aim of bringing together writers and artists in support of the miners. Roland Muldoon of the CAST theatre company played a significant role in the organisation's success, as did the children's writer Michael Rosen. According to the New Musical Express, writing at the time: 'Pit Dragon has managed to harness the talents of every worthwhile artist on the seamier side of the London cabaret circuit and the potential to develop into the most dynamic political/cultural organisation since Rock Against Racism.' In February 1985, the group planned an unusual way of turning a mass picket into a lively cultural occasion. Knight had the idea of inviting fire-eaters, tightrope walkers, poets, comedians, jugglers and musicians to meet at the gates of Neasden Power Station in Brent, North London. The police were warned in advance, the artists staged their performances on the picket line and not one truck even attempted to get through. The picket was counted a success when the power station was shut down for the day.

Reminiscent of the carnivalesque atmosphere outside the Neasden Power Station was the mass picket held in Liverpool to celebrate the first anniversary of the Liverpool dockers' strike and lock-out which had begun late in 1995. Linking up with activists in the anti-car movement Reclaim the Streets, Knight used his position in the London Support Group to introduce the dockers to these 'Kill the Car' environmentalists. Realizing they had much in common, the two culturally different groups spent the summer of 1996 working on an ambitious plan. On 28 September, a 10,000 strong celebratory cultural event and street party was held on the quayside, followed at break of dawn next morning by a mass picket and symbolic roof-top occupation of what the dockers termed 'the rat house' – the Mersey Docks and Harbour Company headquarters and nearby gantries.

For twelve months, Britain's mainstream media outlets had effectively ignored the long-running dispute. But the dockers' alliance with musicians and environmentalists now drew attention to the docker's cause, leading them to continue their strike into its second year. The dispute gathered momentum such that by late January 1997, trade unionists in over a hundred ports and cities across the world had linked up with environmentalists and others in making the action global. In the end, the dockers' picket line was a record-breaker, lasting for more than two years.

The cultural events sponsored by Knight and his Reclaim the Streets in Liverpool were influences on the 'Battle of Seattle' which broke out in November 1999. Two years earlier, Seattle had been the port where an alliance between dockers, musicians, environmentalists and others had combined forces in support of an internationalist cause. 'Save the Whales' and 'Save the Turtles' activists had long been working alongside 'Save Our Jobs' trade unionists. These developments in Seattle meant that when the World Trade Organization decided to hold its 1999 Convention in the city, activists across the area were primed for resistance to the WTO's globalisation project.

During the build-up to the 2009 G-20 Summit in London, Knight was involved in a street theatre group known as The Government of the Dead. Statements he made at this time in an interview for the London Evening Standard (and the PM programme) led the Corporate Management Team at the University of East London to charge him with 'advocating violence' and 'bringing the university into disrepute'. In particular, he had said that his group would impose the switching off of lights during Earth Hour by force, if need be. He was suspended and, despite a petition signed by over 700 academics and others, 'summarily dismissed' on 22 July 2009.

On 28 April 2011, Knight was one of three people arrested "on suspicion of conspiracy to cause public nuisance and breach of the peace". The three were planning a mock execution of the Duke of York (Prince Andrew) in Central London the following day, to coincide with the wedding of Prince William and Catherine Middleton. All three were later released without charge.

On 30 November 2011, Knight was one of 21 'Occupy London' activists arrested and later charged with public order offences for occupying the Haymarket (Central London) offices of the mining company Xstrata in a protest against the company's diversion of the McArthur River in the Northern Territory of Australia, violating sites held sacred by the Yanyuwa, Mara, Garrawa and Gurdanji traditional owners of the region. On 8 August 2012, following a hearing at Westminster Magistrates' Court, Knight and his co-defendants were all found not guilty.

In 2017, Knight supported Ken Livingstone in a controversy over allegedly anti-Semitic remarks made by the former London Mayor in 2016.

== Family background ==
Knight was born in 1942 in Bury St Edmunds, Suffolk, where his mother Nora Dalton (born 1922, daughter of Philip Dalton and Nora Hennessy) had been serving in the Land Army. His father, Denis Knight, was born in 1921 in Volos, Greece, while Denis' own father, W. L. C. Knight, was serving as Consul General in Salonika. William Lowry Craig Knight was born in Cookstown, Co. Tyrone in 1889 and educated in the Royal School, Dungannon and Pembroke College, Cambridge. British Consul-General in Tunis, 1937–40; Basra, 1942–46; Athens, 1946 and Salonica, 1946–49, W. L. C. Knight is today perhaps best known as the author of a Foreign Office memorandum which, in 1941, recommended the return of the Elgin Marbles to Greece. From 1 September 1941 to 10 January 1947, Denis served in the 44th Royal Tank Regiment as a tank co-driver. He stayed with the same crew in C Squadron throughout, first joining them in Egypt and Palestine in 1942. His first frontline action was in July 1943 as part of Operation Husky, the invasion of Sicily, with especially heavy fighting south of Catania at Primasole Bridge. He continued to be in the thick of it in late 1943 as the Eighth Army pressed up from the heel of Italy along the Adriatic coast. In early 1944 the 44th RTR returned to the UK to prepare for the invasion of Normandy, landing on Gold Beach on D-Day +2. Once again they were in the heart of the action around Caen and Falaise, then through northern France and into Holland where they were a vital part of Operation Market Garden, protecting the land corridor to Arnhem. Their final campaign was the invasion of Germany itself, crossing the Rhine at Xanten on 24 March 1945 – the first British tanks to do so. They continued to face stiff opposition from diehard Nazi troops as they took Bremen, and then on to Hamburg, when hostilities ceased on 5 May 1945. Denis and his tank crew were fortunate to survive – many of their comrades did not. In later life, Denis achieved recognition as a significant war-poet, while in 1986 he published an edited collection of essays by William Cobbett. Nora and Denis remained together for life and had five children (Christopher, Kevin, Elizabeth, Peter and Simon). When he was 30, Chris formed a long-term relationship with Ann Bliss. The couple have three children (Rosie, Olivia and Jude) and eight grandchildren.
