= Animal language =

Complex animal communication

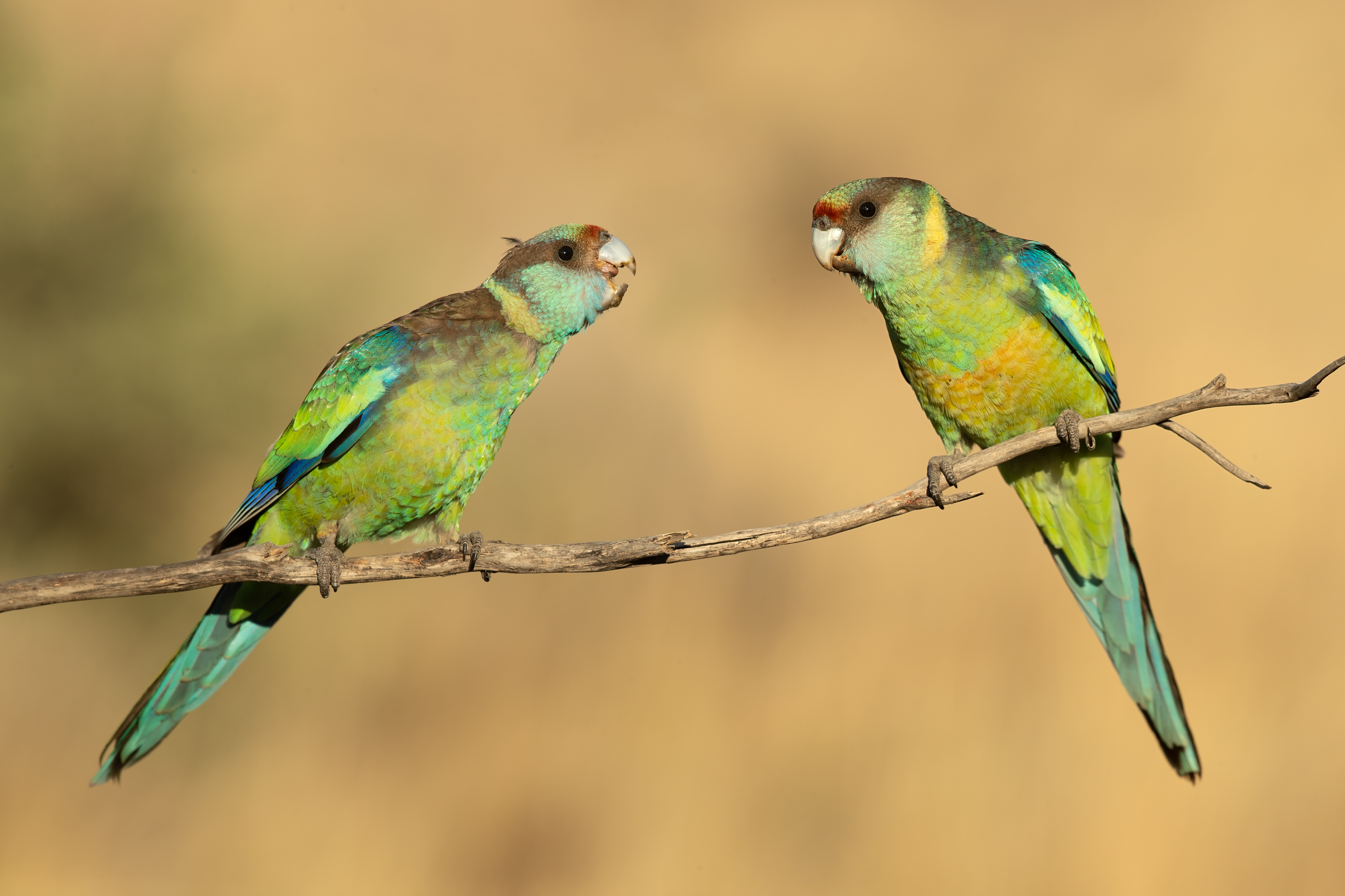
Parrots (Australian ringneck)

Animal languages are forms of communication between non-human animals that show similarities to human language. Animals communicate through a variety of signs, such as sounds and movements. Signing among animals may be considered a form of language if the inventory of signs is large enough, the signs are relatively arbitrary, and the animals seem to produce them with a degree of volition (as opposed to relatively automatic conditioned behaviors or unconditioned instincts, usually including facial expressions).

The current academic consensus is that animal communication systems lack key aspects that might define them as languages (or equivalent to human languages), one such aspect being humans' creation of new patterns of signs under varied circumstances. Humans routinely produce entirely new combinations of words. Some researchers, including the linguist Charles Hockett, argue that human language and animal communication differ so much that the underlying principles are unrelated. Accordingly, linguist Thomas A. Sebeok has proposed to not use the term "language" for animal sign systems. However, other linguists and biologists, including Marc Hauser, Noam Chomsky, and W. Tecumseh Fitch, assert that an evolutionary continuum exists between the communication methods of animal and human language.

== Aspects of human language ==
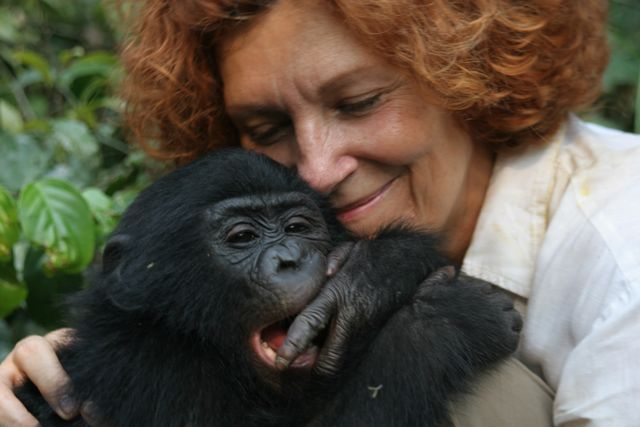
The Belgian conservationist Claudine André with a bonobo

Some experts argue the following properties separate human language from animal communication:

- Arbitrariness: In (human) language, there is almost never a rational or predictable relationship between a sound or sign and the meaning of that sound or sign. For example, there is nothing intrinsically house-like about the word "house", which is casa in Spanish, maison in French, and ie (家) in Japanese.
- Discreteness: Language is composed of small, separate, and repeatable parts (discrete units, e.g. morphemes) that are used in different combinations to create meaning.
- Displacement: Language is able to communicate about concepts or objects that are not in the immediate vicinity, either spatially or temporally.
- Duality of patterning: A small set of sounds that are meaningless in isolation (phonemes, or articulation features in sign languages), when used in different combinations, produces an enormous set of linguistically meaningful units (words or morphemes). Thus, a language's collection of only tens or dozens of phonemes often produces tens of thousands of basic words. This is also referred to as double articulation.
- Productivity: The above also relates to how users can understand and create an indefinitely large number of utterances. A huge but finite set of words can be combined to create nearly-infinite meaningful possible sentences.
- Semanticity: Specific signals (symbolic gestures or noises) have specific meanings.

Research with apes, like that of Francine Patterson with Koko (gorilla) or Allen and Beatrix Gardner with Washoe (chimpanzee), suggested that apes are capable of using limited degrees of language that meet some of these requirements, including arbitrariness, discreteness, and productivity.

In the wild, chimpanzees have been seen "talking" to each other when warning about approaching danger. For example, if one chimpanzee sees a snake, said chimpanzee may make a low, rumbling noise, signaling for all the other chimps to climb into nearby trees. In this case, the chimpanzees' communication does not indicate displacement, as it is entirely contained to an observable event.

Arbitrariness has been noted in meerkat calls; bee dances demonstrate elements of spatial displacement; and cultural transmission has possibly occurred through language between the bonobos named Kanzi and Panbanisha.

Claims that animals have language skills akin to humans, however, are extremely controversial. In his book The Language Instinct, Steven Pinker argues that claims of chimpanzees acquiring language are exaggerated and rest on very limited or specious evidence.

The American linguist Charles Hockett theorized that there are sixteen features of human language that distinguish human communication from that of animals. He called these the design features of language. The features mentioned below have so far been found in all spoken human languages, and at least one is missing from any other animal communication system.

- Vocal-auditory channel: Sounds are emitted from the mouth and perceived by the auditory system. While this applies to many animal communication systems, there are many exceptions, such as those relying on visual communication. One example is cobras extending the ribs behind their heads to send the message of intimidation or of feeling threatened. In humans, sign languages provide many examples of fully formed languages that use a visual channel.
- Broadcast transmission and directional reception: This requires that the recipient can tell the direction that the signal comes from and thus the originator of the signal.
- Rapid fading (transitory nature): The signal lasts a short time. This is true of all systems involving sound. It does not take into account audio recording technology and is also not true for written language. It tends not to apply to animal signals involving chemicals and smells which often fade slowly. For example, a skunk's smell, produced in its glands, lingers to deter a predator from attacking.
- Interchangeability: All utterances that are understood can be produced. This is different from some communication systems where, for example, males produce one set of behaviors and females another and they are unable to interchange these messages so that males use the female signal and vice versa. For example, Heliothine moths have differentiated communication: females are able to send a chemical to indicate preparedness to mate, while males cannot send the chemical.
- Total feedback: The sender of a message is aware of the message being sent.
- Specialization: The signal produced is intended for communication and is not due to another behavior. For example, dog panting is a natural reaction to being overheated, but is not produced to specifically relay a particular message.
- Semanticity: There is some fixed relationship between a signal and a meaning.

== Primates ==
Humans are able to distinguish real words from fake words based on the phonological order of the word itself. In a 2013 study, baboons were shown to have this skill as well. The discovery has led researchers to believe that reading is not as advanced a skill as previously believed, but instead based on the ability to recognize and distinguish letters from one another. The experimental setup consisted of six young adult baboons, and results were measured by allowing the animals to use a touch screen and select whether or not the displayed word was a real word, or a non-word such as "dran" or "telk". The study lasted for six weeks, with approximately 50,000 tests completed in that time. The researchers minimized common bigrams, or combinations of two letters, in non-words, and maximized them in real words. Further studies will attempt to teach baboons how to use an artificial alphabet.

In a 2016 study, a team of biologists from several universities concluded that macaques possess vocal tracts physically capable of speech, "but lack a speech-ready brain to control it".

== Non-primates ==
Among the most studied examples of non-primate languages are:

=== Vertebrates ===
==== Birds ====
- Bird songs: Songbirds can be highly articulate, with many species having a large variety of complex songs. They are not fully understood but are associated with courtship and territory. Songs are copied, not innately known, and exposure to birdsong is necessary early in a songbird's life, or its communication skills will be permanently harmed. Bird songs are distinct from calls, with calls typically being short, simple and with an urgent functional purpose, such as raising the alarm over a nearby predator. Research of call combinations suggests that songbirds employ compositional syntax and semanticity, linguistic capabilities thought to be unique to human language.
- Corvids: Crows, ravens and some other corvids can accurately mimic human words and phrases, but unlike parrots they do not seem able to use those words to answer human questions. This is despite crows having amongst the best tool-use and problem solving skills out of all animals, including being able to understand recursion.

==== Mammals ====
- African forest elephants: Cornell University's Elephant Listening Project began in 1999 when Katy Payne began studying the calls of African forest elephants in Dzanga National Park in the Central African Republic. Andrea Turkalo has continued Payne's work in Dzanga National Park by observing elephant communication. For nearly 20 years, Turkalo has used a spectrogram to record the noises that the elephants make. After extensive observation and research, she has been able to recognize elephants by their voices. Researchers hope to translate these voices into an elephant dictionary, but this will likely not occur for many years. Because elephant calls are often made at very low frequencies, the spectrogram is designed to detect lower frequencies than humans can perceive, allowing Turkalo to better understand the elephants' noise making. Cornell's research on African forest elephants has challenged the idea that humans are considerably better at using language than animals, and that animals only have a small set of information they can convey to others. As Turkalo explained, "many of their calls are in some ways similar to human speech." Elephants in captivity can be taught to remember tone, melody, and recognise more than 20 words.
- Mustached bats: Since these animals spend most of their lives in the dark, they rely heavily on their auditory system to communicate, including via echolocation and using calls to locate each other. Studies have shown that mustached bats use a wide variety of calls to communicate with one another. These calls include 33 different sounds, or "syllables", that the bats either use alone or combine in various ways to form composite syllables.
- Prairie dogs: Con Slobodchikoff studied prairie dog communication and discovered that they use different alarm calls and escape behaviors for different species of predators. Their calls transmit semantic information, which was demonstrated when playbacks of alarm calls in the absence of predators led to escape behavior appropriate for the types of predators associated with the calls. The alarm calls also contain descriptive information about the general size, color, and speed of the predator.

===== Aquatic mammals =====
- Bottlenose dolphins: Dolphins can hear one another up to 6 miles apart underwater. Not only do dolphins communicate via nonverbal cues, they also seem to chatter and respond to other dolphins' vocalizations.

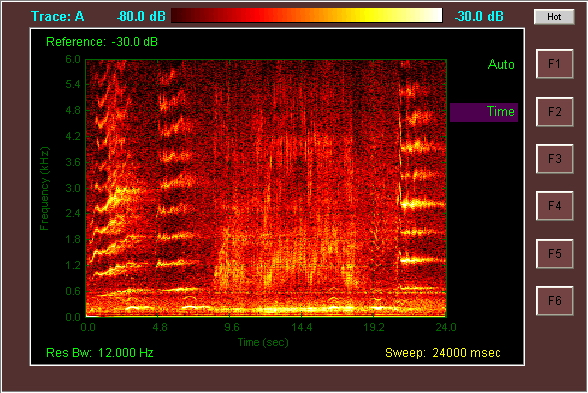
Spectrogram of humpback whale vocalizations. Detail is shown for the first 24 seconds of the 37 second humpback whale "song" recording. The whale songs and echolocation "clicks" are visible as horizontal striations and vertical sweeps respectively.

- Whales: Two groups of whales, the humpback whale and a subspecies of blue whale found in the Indian Ocean, are known to produce repeated sounds at varying frequencies, known as whale songs. Male humpback whales perform these vocalizations only during the mating season, and so it is surmised the purpose of songs is to aid sexual selection. Humpbacks also make a sound called a feeding call, which is five to ten seconds in length at a nearly constant frequency. Humpbacks generally feed cooperatively by gathering in groups, swimming underneath shoals of fish and lunging up vertically through the fish and out of the water together. Prior to these lunges, whales make their feeding call. The exact purpose of the call is not known, but research suggests that fish react to it. When the sound was played back to them, a group of herring responded to the sound by moving away from the call, even though no whale was present.
- Sea lions: Since 1971, Ronald J. Schusterman and his research associates have studied sea lions' cognitive ability. They have discovered that sea lions are able to recognize relationships between stimuli based on similar functions or connections made with their peers, rather than only the stimuli's common features. This is called equivalence classification. This ability to recognize equivalence may be a precursor to language. Research is currently being conducted at the Pinniped Cognition & Sensory Systems Laboratory to determine how sea lions form these equivalence relations. Sea lions have also been proven to understand simple syntax and commands when taught an artificial sign language similar to one used with primates. The sea lions studied were able to learn and use a number of syntactic relations between the signs they were taught, such as how the signs should be arranged in relation to each other. However, the sea lions rarely used the signs semantically or logically. In the wild, it is thought that sea lions use reasoning skills associated with equivalence relations in order to make important decisions that can affect their survival, e.g. recognizing friends and relatives or avoiding enemies and predators. Sea lions use various postural positions and a range of barks, chirps, clicks, moans, growls, and squeaks to communicate. It has yet to be proven that sea lions use echolocation as a means of communication.

The effects of learning on auditory signaling in these animals is of interest to researchers. Several investigators have pointed out that some marine mammals appear to have the capacity to alter both the contextual and structural features of their vocalizations as a result of experience. Janik and Slater have stated that learning can modify vocalizations in one of two ways, by influencing the context in which a particular call is used, or by altering the acoustic structure of the call itself. Male California sea lions can learn to inhibit their barking in the presence of any male dominant to them, but vocalize normally when dominant males are absent. The different call types of gray seals can be selectively conditioned and controlled by different cues, and the use of food reinforcement can also modify vocal emissions. A captive male harbor seal named Hoover demonstrated a case of vocal mimicry, but similar observations have not been reported since. Still shows that under the right circumstances pinnipeds may use auditory experience in addition to environmental consequences such as food reinforcement and social feedback to modify their vocal emissions.

In a 1992 study, Robert Gisiner and Schusterman conducted experiments in which they attempted to teach syntax to a female California sea lion named Rocky. Rocky was taught signed words, then she was asked to perform various tasks dependent on word order after viewing a signed instruction. It was found that Rocky was able to determine relations between signs and words, and form basic syntax. A 1993 study by Schusterman and David Kastak found that the California sea lion was capable of understanding abstract concepts such as symmetry, sameness and transitivity. This suggests that equivalence relations can form without language.

The distinctive sounds of sea lions are produced both above and below water. To mark territory, sea lions "bark", with non-alpha males making more noise than alphas. Although females also bark, they do so less frequently and most often in connection with birthing pups or caring for their young. Females produce a highly directional bawling vocalization, the pup attraction call, which helps mothers and pups locate one another. As noted in Animal Behavior, their amphibious lifestyle has made them need acoustic communication for social organization while on land.

Sea lions can hear frequencies between 100 Hz and 40,000 Hz, and vocalize from 100 to 10,000 Hz.

==== Fish ====
- Freshwater elephantfish have been observed to have their own language.
- Mexican Tetra have been observed communicating with a series of clicks, and have also been observed to have regional accents.

=== Invertebrates ===
==== Insects ====
- Bee dancing: Used to communicate the direction and distance of food source in many species of bees. In 2023, James C. Nieh, Associate Dean and Professor of Biology with the University of California, San Diego, performed an experiment to determine if the dances of bees were innate skills or if they were developed through observation of older bees within their hive. The research group determined that the dance bees performed was to some degree innate, but the consistency and accuracy of the dance was a skill passed down by older bees. Although the experimental hive that contained only workers of the same age developed better accuracy when conveying angle and direction as they got older, their ability to communicate distance never reached the level of the control beehives.

==== Mollusks ====
- Caribbean reef squid have been shown to communicate using a variety of color, shape, and texture changes. Squid are capable of rapid changes in skin color and pattern through nervous system control of chromatophores. In addition to camouflage and appearing larger in the face of a threat, squid use color, patterns, and flashing to communicate with one another in various courtship rituals. Caribbean reef squid can send one message via color patterns to a squid on their right, while they send another message to a squid on their left.

== Comparison of "animal language" and "animal communication" ==
It is worth distinguishing "animal language" from "animal communication", although there is some comparative interchange in certain cases (e.g. Cheney & Seyfarth's vervet monkey call studies). Animal language typically does not include bee dancing, bird song, whale song, dolphin signature whistles, prairie dog alarm calls, or the communicative systems found in most social mammals. The features of language as listed above are a dated formulation by Hockett in 1960. Through this formulation Hockett made one of the earliest attempts to break down features of human language for the purpose of applying Darwinian gradualism. Although an influence on early animal language efforts (see below), it is no longer considered the key architecture at the core of animal language research.

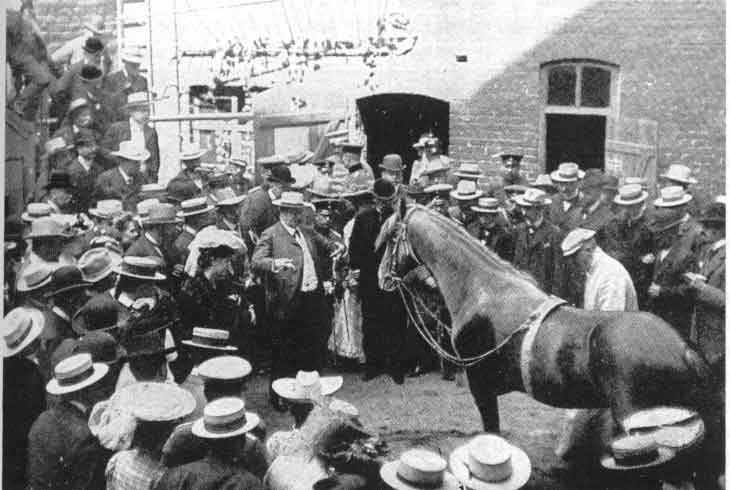
Clever Hans, an Orlov Trotter horse that was claimed to have been able to perform arithmetic and other intellectual tasks

Animal language results are controversial for several reasons (for a related controversy, see also Clever Hans). Early chimpanzee work was executed using chimpanzee infants raised as if they were human; a test of the nature vs. nurture hypothesis. Chimpanzees have a laryngeal structure very different from that of humans, and it has been suggested that chimpanzees are not capable of voluntary control of their breathing, although better studies are needed to accurately confirm this. This combination is thought to make it very difficult for the chimpanzees to reproduce the vocal intonations required for human language. Researchers eventually moved towards a gestural (sign language) modality, as well as keyboard devices with buttons with symbols (known as "lexigrams") that the animals could press to produce artificial language. Other chimpanzees learned by observing human subjects performing the task. This latter group of researchers studying chimpanzee communication through symbol recognition (keyboard) as well as through the use of sign language (gestural), are on the forefront of communicative breakthroughs in the study of animal language, and they are familiar with their subjects on a first name basis: Sarah, Lana, Kanzi, Koko, Sherman, Austin and Chantek.

Perhaps the best known critic of animal language is Herbert Terrace. Terrace's 1979 criticism using his own research with the chimpanzee Nim Chimpsky was scathing and spelled the end of animal language research in that era, most of which emphasized the production of language by animals. In short, he accused researchers of over-interpreting their results, especially as it is rarely parsimonious to ascribe true intentional "language production" when other simpler explanations for the behaviors (gestural hand signs) could be put forth. Additionally, his animals failed to show generalization of the concept of reference between the modalities of comprehension and production; this generalization is one of many fundamental ones that are trivial for human language use. The simpler explanation according to Terrace was that the animals had learned a sophisticated series of context-based behavioral strategies to obtain either primary (food) or social reinforcement, behaviors that could be over-interpreted as language use.

In 1984 Louis Herman published an account of artificial language found in the bottlenose dolphin in the journal Cognition. A major difference between Herman's work and previous research was his emphasis on a method of studying language comprehension only (rather than language comprehension and production by the animal(s)), which enabled rigorous controls and statistical tests, largely because he was limiting his research to evaluating the animals' physical behaviors (in response to sentences) with blinded observers, rather than attempting to interpret possible language utterances or productions. The dolphins' names here were Akeakamai and Phoenix. Irene Pepperberg used the vocal modality for language production and comprehension in a grey parrot named Alex in the verbal mode, and Sue Savage-Rumbaugh continues to study bonobos such as Kanzi and Panbanisha. R. Schusterman duplicated many of the dolphin results in his California sea lions ("Rocky"), and came from a more behaviorist tradition than Herman's cognitive approach. Schusterman's emphasis is on the importance on a learning structure known as equivalence classes.

However, overall, there has not been any meaningful dialog between the linguistics and animal language spheres, despite capturing the public's imagination in the popular press. Furthermore, the growing field of language evolution is another source of future interchange between these disciplines. Most primate researchers tend to show a bias toward a shared pre-linguistic ability between humans and chimpanzees, dating back to a common ancestor, while dolphin and parrot researchers stress the general cognitive principles underlying these abilities. More recent related controversies regarding animal abilities include the closely linked areas of theory of mind, Imitation (e.g. Nehaniv & Dautenhahn, 2002), Animal Culture (e.g. Rendell & Whitehead, 2001), and Language Evolution (e.g. Christiansen & Kirby, 2003).

There has been a recent emergence in animal language research which has contested the idea that animal communication is less sophisticated than human communication. Denise Herzing has done research on dolphins in the Bahamas whereby she created a two-way conversation via a submerged keyboard. The keyboard allows divers to communicate with wild dolphins. By using sounds and symbols on each key the dolphins could either press the key with their nose or mimic the whistling sound emitted in order to ask humans for a specific prop. This ongoing experiment has shown that in non-linguistic creatures sophisticated and rapid thinking does occur despite our previous conceptions of animal communication. Further research done with Kanzi using lexigrams has strengthened the idea that animal communication is much more complex than once thought.

== See also ==
- Animal cognition
- Animal communication
- Animal consciousness
- Animal culture
- Animal training
- Bioacoustics
- Biosemiotics
- Constructed language
- Great ape language
- Human–animal communication
- Linguistics
- Operant conditioning
- Origin of language
- Origin of speech
- Sign language
- Talking animal
- Talking Birds
- Theory of mind
- Yerkish
- Zoosemiotics

=== Researchers ===
- Deborah Fouts
- Roger Fouts
- Erich Jarvis
- Mary Lee Jensvold
- David Premack
- Michael Tomasello
- Frans de Waal
- Con Slobodchikoff

=== Animals ===
- Batyr (elephant)
- Greater spot-nosed monkey
- N'kisi (grey parrot)
- Koko (gorilla)
- Parrots
- Hummingbirds
- Domestic mink
- Songbirds
