= Sussman =

Süßmann is a German surname meaning "sweet-man" and has several variations due to transliteration obstacles. It is also one of the Jewish surnames.

== Variations of the surname ==
Süssman is a surname. Notable people with the surname include:

- Wilhelm Süssmann (or Wilhelm Süssman) (1891–1941), general in the Battle of Crete

Sussman is a surname. Notable people with the surname include:

- Abraham Sussmann (fl. 19th century), British shoḥet and writer
- Amanda Sussman (born 1972), Canadian author, speaker
- Barry Sussman (1934–2022), city news editor at The Washington Post at the time of the Watergate break-in
- Barth Jules Sussman, American novelist
- Brian Sussman (b. 1956), American conservative talk radio
- Eve Sussman, British-American artist
- Fiona Sussman (b. 1965), New Zealand writer and doctor
- Gerald Jay Sussman (b. 1947), computer scientist
- Harvey M. Sussman, American linguist
- Joel Sussman (b. 1943), Israeli crystallographer
- Joseph M. Sussman (1939–2018), American professor
- Josh Sussman (b. 1983), American actor
- Kevin Sussman (b. 1970), American actor
- Michael Sussmann (b. 1964), American attorney
- Mike Sussman (b. 1967), TV series writer and producer
- Paul Sussman (1966–2012), English author, archaeologist and journalist
- Louis Sussmann-Hellborn (1828–1908), German sculptor, painter, art collector and contractor
- Rosalyn Sussman Yalow (1921–2011), American medical physicist, and a co-winner of the 1977 Nobel Prize in Physiology or Medicine
- Sam Sussman (b. 1991), American novelist
- Soren Hunter Miles Sussman Thompson (b. 1981), American world champion and Olympic fencer

Susman is a surname. Notable people with the surname include:

- Andrew Susman (b. 1968), American communications executive, co-founder and former CEO of Studio One Networks
- Ellen Susman (b. 1950), American journalist, philanthropist, and television producer
- John Susman, American writer of plays and films
- Karen Hantze Susman (b. 1942), retired American tennis player
- Margarete Susman (1872–1966), German-Jewish poet, writer, and critic
- Stephen Susman (1941–2020), American plaintiffs attorney and a founding partner of Susman Godfrey
- Tina Susman, American journalist and editor and formerly missing person
- Todd Susman (b. 1947), American actor
- William Susman (b. 1960), American composer
- short name of lawfirm Susman Godfrey LLP

Suzman is a surname. Notable people with the surname include:

- Helen Suzman (1917–2009), South African anti-apartheid activist and politician
- James Suzman, South African anthropologist
- Janet Suzman (b. 1939), British-South African actress and director, and niece of Helen Suzman

== Film ==
- Susman, 1987 Hindi film directed by Shyam Benegal
