= Herzing =

Herzing may refer to:

- Denise L. Herzing, American cetologist
- Herzing University, in Wisconsin
