= Studio Uno =

Studio Uno may refer to:

- Studio Uno (TV series), broadcast on Rai 1, 1961–66
- Studio Uno (album), by Mina, 1965

== See also ==
- Studio Uno 66, 1966 album by Mina
- Studio One
