= Golnaz =

Golnaz is a given name. Notable people with the given name include:

- Golnaz Fathi (born 1972), Iranian contemporary artist
- Golnaz Modarresi Ghavami (born 1966), Iranian linguist
