= Complete feedback =

Design feature of language

Complete feedback is one of Charles Hockett's 16 design features of language which states that speakers are able to receive feedback on what they are vocalizing through their auditory channels. Hockett claimed that total feedback made it possible to internalize communicative behavior, which comprised a major portion of "thinking".
