= Semanticity =

Hockett's design feature of language

Semanticity is one of Charles Hockett's 16 design features of language. Semanticity refers to the use of arbitrary or nonarbitrary signals to transmit meaningful messages, with relatively fixed associations between certain signals and what they represent. For example, the English word "salt" means salt, not sugar or pepper; in contrast, a dog's panting does not mean that it is hot, but only conveys that information as a side effect.

Hockett's view that signals 'carry' inherent meaning has been contrasted with findings that the meanings of words and phrases depend on context and inference.

== See also ==
- Hockett's design features
