= Studio One =

Studio One or Studio 1 may refer to:

- Studio One (software), digital audio workstation software, developed by PreSonus
- Studio One (American TV series), a 1948–1958 American television anthology series
- Studio One (radio series), 1947-1948 American radio anthology series
- Studio One (Emirati TV program), a 2011–2014 television program broadcast in the MENA region on Dubai One
- Studio One (record label), a Jamaican recording studio and record label in 1954–1980s
- Studio One (recording studio), an American facility in 1970–1989
- Studio 1 (album), a 2006 album by British girl group All Saints
- Studio 1, a project and label of German techno musician Wolfgang Voigt
- Studio One (company), an American marketing company
- Studio One (nightclub), (later The Factory), a nightclub in West Hollywood, United States
- Studio One 19, a computer from Dell, released in 2009
- Disney Studio 1, a building in Disneyland Paris, France
- Studio One, a service of Iowa Public Radio

== See also ==
- Studio Uno
