= Boy From the North Country =

2025 novel by Sam Sussman

Boy from the North Country
- Author: Sam Sussman
- Language: English
- Genre: Literary fiction
- Publisher: Penguin Random House
- Publication date: September 16, 2025
- Publication place: United States
- ISBN: 0-593-83505-0

Boy from the North Country is the debut novel by Sam Sussman, published by Penguin Press in the United States on September 16, 2025, and by Grove Press in the United Kingdom on October 2, 2025. The autobiographical novel is based on Sussman’s Harper’s Magazine memoir, “The Silent Type: On (Possibly) Being Bob Dylan’s Son.”

Sussman recorded and reads the audiobook for Boy From the North Country.

== Reception ==
Boy from the North Country was well received by critics, including starred reviews from Booklist, Kirkus Reviews, and Publishers Weekly.

Kirkus called the novel “The most beautiful and moving mother-son story in recent memory,” while Library Journal called the book “required reading for Dylanologists eager to see yet another side of their idol.”
