= Double articulation =

Fundamental principle of linguistics

In linguistics, double articulation, duality of patterning, or duality is the fundamental language phenomenon consisting of the use of combinations of a small number of meaningless elements (sounds, that is, phonemes) to produce a large number of meaningful elements (words, actually morphemes). Its name refers to this two-level structure inherent to sign systems, many of which are composed of these two kinds of elements: 1) distinctive but meaningless and 2) significant or meaningful.

It is one of Hockett's design features.

== Theory ==
Double articulation refers to the twofold structure of the stream of speech, which can be primarily divided into meaningful signs (like words or morphemes), and then secondarily into distinctive elements (like sounds or phonemes). For example, the meaningful English word "cat" is composed of the sounds /k/, /æ/, and /t/, which are meaningless as separate individual sounds (and which can also be combined to form other separate words "tack" and "act", with distinct meanings). These sounds, called phonemes, represent the secondary and lowest level of articulation in the hierarchy of the organization of speech. Higher, primary, levels of organization (including morphology, syntax, and semantics) govern the combination of these individually meaningless phonemes into meaningful elements.

== History ==
The French concept of double articulation was first introduced by André Martinet in 1949, and elaborated in his Éléments de linguistique générale (1960). The English translation double articulation is a French calque for double articulation (spelled exactly the same in French). It may also be termed duality of patterning.

"Duality of patterning" was proposed by American linguist Charles F. Hockett in a 1958 textbook A course in modern linguistics. The two terms are similar but different, and Hockett and Martinet proposed their concepts independently. Both of them were probably inspired by Danish linguist Louis Hjelmslev's theory of "two planes" of human language. Hjelmslev proposed that human languages have two kinds of planes: planes of plereme ("fullness" in Greek) and planes of ceneme ("emptiness" in Greek). The planes of plereme contain meaningful units, and the planes of ceneme contain meaningless units that make up the meaningful units. For example, the cenemes of spoken language are phonemes, while the pleremes are morphemes or words; the cenemes of alphabetic writing are the letters and the pleremes are the words.

Sign languages may have less double articulation because more gestures are possible than sounds and able to convey more meaning without double articulation.

== See also ==
- Origin of language
- Origin of speech
