= Vocal-auditory channel =

Vocal-auditory channel is the first of 13 design features proposed by Charles F. Hockett in characterizing human language and distinguishing it from animal communication. It describes the way vocal signals can be used to produce language. The speaker uses a vocal tract (containing most of the speech organs) to produce speech sounds, and the hearer employs an auditory apparatus (the sense of hearing) to receive and process the speech sounds. This is why human language is said to be based on speech sounds produced by the articulatory system and received through the auditory system. The vocal channel is a particularly excellent means through which speech sounds can be accompanied or substituted by gestures, facial expressions, body movement, and way of dressing. However, Hockett considers this design feature one which is fundamentally advantageous for primates as "it leaves much of the body free for other activities that can be carried on at the same time."

== See also ==
- Animal communication
- Hockett's design features

== Sources ==
- Saxton, Matthew (2010). Child Language: Acquisition and Development. Sage. p. 29.
- Fatima SADIQI and Moha ENNAJI.(1992). Introduction To Modern Linguistics. AFRIQUE-ORIENT
