= Traditional transmission =

Design features of a language

Traditional transmission (also called cultural transmission) is one of the 13 design features of language developed by anthropologist Charles F. Hockett to distinguish the features of human language from that of animal communication. Critically, animal communication might display some of the thirteen features but never all of them. It is typically considered as one of the crucial characteristics distinguishing human from animal communication and provides significant support for the argument that language is learned socially within a community and not inborn where the acquisition of information is via the avenue of genetic inheritance.

In essence, the idea of traditional transmission details the process by which language is passed down from one generation to the next. In this manner, it is often also referred to as cultural transmission where it is a mechanism of iterated learning. Common processes would include imitation or teaching. The model purports that present learners acquire the cultural behaviour, that is language in this instance by observing similar behaviours in others who acquired the language the same way. This is an important distinction made in the Scientific American The Origin of Speech, where Hockett defines traditional transmission as "the detailed conventions of any one language are transmitted extra-genetically by learning and teaching". While culture is not unique to the human species, the way it exhibits itself as language in human society is very distinctive and one key trait of this uniqueness is the element of social groups.

== Social groups ==
Traditional transmission is exemplified by the sociological context of social groups. American sociologist C.H. Cooley classifies social groups on the basis of contact in primary groups. In his paper Social Organization (1909), he describes primary groups (family, playgroups, neighborhoods, community of elders) as "those characterized by intimate face-to-face association and cooperation." Although there are other types of classifications by other sociologists, Cooley's classification and description is more applicable to the concept of traditional transmission. The idea of intimate interactions aligns with how the language is transmitted from the parents to their next generation on a fundamental level.

Consequently, following this line of thought, social groups play an integral role in the transmission of language from one generation to the next. In support of this notion, the importance of social groups in traditional transmission is illustrated in the presence of social isolation and children end up with an inability to effectively acquire a language. A child raised in social isolation would be commonly known as a "feral child/wild child". The following examples showcase a few classic case studies of rescued "wild" children who have gone through language deprivation and form credible support for the argument of traditional transmission.

Some commonly known examples include:

1) Anna - (born in 1932)

Anna from Pennsylvania, was raised in private due to illegitimacy. Kept hidden and trapped in an attic, malnourished and unable to move, till she was rescued at six years old. This resulted in her lack of language ability. Once rescued, Anna received linguistic input and showed aptitude for understanding instructions but ultimately never acquired speaking.

2) Genie - (born in 1957)

Genie remains one of the most prominent examples of linguistically isolated children ever studied. Only rescued at 13 years of age, Genie was inadequately exposed to language input and demonstrated no language ability upon rescue. Yet with linguistic input that came from her social circles then, Genie gradually acquired communication, albeit neither fluent nor smooth.

3) Victor of Aveyron - (born in 1788)

Victor was one of the earliest feral children studied. Rescued at 12, he ran away from civilisation eight times and his case was eventually undertaken by a young medical student who tried to train him to communicate. Victor showed impressive progress with reading and comprehension of simple words. However, he never progressed beyond a rudimentary level.

== Significance ==
A key consideration when it comes to traditional transmission and why it is a significant milestone in language acquisition is its influence on language learning patterns. Traditional transmission denotes naturally that learning is acquired through social interactions and built upon by teaching and enforcement. This influences research when it comes to language learning patterns, impacting our understanding of human cognition as well as language structure. Compellingly, it also determines the direction of how language should be taught and passed down. From the standpoint of traditional transmission where language manifests as a socially learned, culturally transmitted system, language acquisition is mechanical and is directly affected by the present environment the individual is placed in. This removes the premise of language acquisition from that of a biological construct. Instead of having to biologically explain traditional transmission, it introduces the possibility that the design features of language itself stem from traditional transmission. Of course, for the above to be significant, it means that languages engage in cultural selection for learnability where an assumption of innateness is inconsequential and languages adapt over time due to a need for survival. The above plays a major role in the study of languages, especially in their properties, structure and how it developed with time or throughout human history to be the system it is today; providing valuable insights into language and the human race, language and the human cognition as well as language and its path to survival.

Traditional transmission as a design feature is also significant in that it purports that while some aspects of language could possibly be inborn, the human race crucially acquires their language ability from other speakers. This is distinct from many animal communication systems because most animals are born with the innate knowledge, and skills necessary for survival. For example, honey bees have an inborn ability to perform and understand the waggle dance.

== Controversy and criticism ==
The main argument to the validity of traditional transmission has always been one of social versus biological construct. The concept of language being taught and learnt socially rather than being an innate instinct has been a minefield of debate for years. Specifically, the idea of language being taught extra-genetically has been met with countless criticism. These criticisms mostly stem from the proponents of the American linguist, Noam Chomsky and his school of thought. Chomsky was a supporter of generative grammar. He and his followers believed that humans possess the innate ability for the learning and acquisition of languages. This theory assumes an inborn capacity for language where language learning takes place from a place of priming.

As such, Chomsky's view is that humans invariably have a certain language input at birth and therefore language learning after happens as enforcement based on the already present structure of grammar in the individual. Chomsky also introduced the concept of linguistic competence as "the system of linguistic knowledge possessed by native speakers of a language", to further support the idea of generative grammar. Linguistic competence as opposed to linguistic performance (what is actually uttered) focuses on the mental states, thought processes and representations related to language. Linguistic performance, on the other hand, is defined by Chomsky as the tangible use of language in concrete situations and circumstances. It involves the ideas of production and comprehension of language. The main distinction between performance and competence is the variable of speech errors where one might have full competence of language but yet, still succumb to speech errors in performance because competence and performance are fundamentally two different aspects of language.

Related to generative grammar, Chomsky also proposed the idea of a "Universal Grammar" where he postulates that a specific set of structural rules of language are universal for all human languages which is also a very much controversial topic discussed widely, one of them being the prominent paper by Evans and Levinson (2009). Specifically, Chomsky believed that the reason that children acquired language so easily is due to the innate predisposition of language principles which then enables them to master complex language operations. This in particular is controversial to the ideas of traditional transmission which posits cultural learning and transmission across generations as the tool children capitalise on to acquire language. All in all, Chomsky's ideas and theories have served as the main opposing view to Hockett's design features, remaining highly controversial and a dominant area of research in the linguistics field of studies even till today.

On another front, in the domain of evolutionary linguistics, Wacewicz & Żywiczyński have argued on the whole against Hockett's design features and why his perspective is largely incompatible to modern language evolution research. For traditional transmission, they argue that "the problem with cultural/traditional transmission so conceived is that, again, it has to do purely with the properties of the medium, i.e. the vocal patterns. Per their argument, this is only superficially, if at all, related to what truly counts about human cultural transmission. In their paper, they suggest that comparative research into areas such as critical periods of the acquisition of vocalizations (Marler and Peters 1987) and other areas of vocal learning might raise alternative views that have relevance to language evolution. Hence, their criticisms towards traditional transmission seem to point at an alternate idea of the innate ability in humans for language, instead of being solely dependent on extra-genetic transmission via learning and teaching.
