= Golnaz Modarresi Ghavami =

Iranian linguist

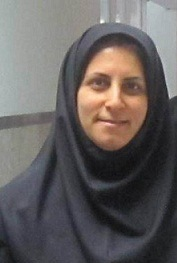
- Born: October 12, 1966 (age 59); State College, Pennsylvania, U.S.
- Education: University of Texas at Austin (PhD); Ferdowsi University (MA); Allameh Tabataba'i University (BA)
- Known for: works on Persian phonetics
- Scientific career
- Fields: Phonology, Phonetics
- Institutions: Allameh Tabataba'i University
- Thesis: The Effects of Syllable Boundary, Stop Consonant Closure Duration, and VOT on VCV Coarticulation (2002)
- Doctoral advisor: Harvey Sussman
- Other academic advisors: Björn E. Lindblom; Robert T. Harms; Megan Crowhurst; Mark R. V. Southern
- Website: http://simap.atu.ac.ir/cv/9693219/?lang=en-gb

Golnaz Modarresi Ghavami (Persian: گلناز مدرسی قوامی; born 12 October 1966) is an Iranian linguist and associate professor of linguistics at Allameh Tabataba'i University. She is known for her research on Persian phonology and phonetics. Her textbook on phonetics is widely taught in Iranian universities.

== Education ==
Modarresi Ghavami received a BA in English translation from Allameh Tabataba'i University in 1989, an MA in linguistics from Ferdowsi University in 1992 and a PhD in linguistics from University of Texas at Austin in 2002.

== Books ==
- Phonetics :The Scientific Study of Speech, Golnaz Modarresi Ghavami, Tehran: SAMT
- A Descriptive Dictionary of Phonology and Phonetics, Golnaz Modarresi Ghavami, Tehran: Elmi
