= Charles F. Hockett =

American linguist (1916–2000)

- Born: Charles Francis Hockett; January 17, 1916; Columbus, Ohio, U.S.
- Died: November 3, 2000 (aged 84); Ithaca, New York, U.S.
- Spouse: Shirley Orlinoff
- Children: 5

Academic background
- Education: Ohio State University (B.A., M.A.); Yale University (Ph.D.)
- Thesis: The Potawatomi Language: A Descriptive Grammar (1939)
- Influences: Leonard Bloomfield

Academic work
- Discipline: Linguist
- Institutions: Cornell University (1946–1982); Rice University (1986–2000)
- Main interests: Structural linguistics; Linguistic anthropology

Charles Francis Hockett (January 17, 1916 – November 3, 2000) was an American linguist who developed many influential ideas in American structuralist linguistics. He represents the post-Bloomfieldian phase of structuralism often referred to as "distributionalism" or "taxonomic structuralism". His academic career spanned over half a century at Cornell and Rice universities. Hockett was also a firm believer of linguistics as a branch of anthropology, making contributions that were significant to the field of anthropology as well.

== Professional and academic career ==
=== Education ===
At the age of 16, Hockett enrolled at Ohio State University in Columbus, Ohio where he received a Bachelor of Arts and Master of Arts in ancient history. While enrolled at Ohio State, Hockett became interested in the work of Leonard Bloomfield, a leading figure in the field of structural linguistics. Hockett continued his education at Yale University where he studied anthropology and linguistics and received his PhD in anthropology in 1939. While studying at Yale, Hockett studied with several other influential linguists such as Edward Sapir, George P. Murdock, and Benjamin Whorf. Hockett's dissertation was based on his fieldwork in Potawatomi; his paper on Potawatomi syntax was published in Language in 1939. In 1948 his dissertation was published as a series in the International Journal of American Linguistics. Following fieldwork in Kickapoo and Michoacán, Mexico, Hockett did two years of postdoctoral study with Leonard Bloomfield in Chicago and Michigan.

=== Career ===
Hockett began his teaching career in 1946 as an assistant professor of linguistics in the Division of Modern Languages at Cornell University where he was responsible for directing the Chinese language program. In 1957, Hockett became a member of Cornell's anthropology department and continued to teach anthropology and linguistics until he retired to emeritus status in 1982. In 1986, he took up an adjunct post at Rice University in Houston, Texas, where he remained active until his death in 2000.

=== Achievements ===
Charles Hockett held membership among many academic institutions such as the National Academy of Sciences the American Academy of Arts and Sciences, and the Society of Fellows at Harvard University. He served as president of both the Linguistic Society of America and the Linguistic Association of Canada and the United States.

In addition to making many contributions to the field of structural linguistics, Hockett also considered such things as Whorfian Theory, jokes, the nature of writing systems, slips of the tongue, and animal communication and their relativeness to speech.

Outside the realm of linguistics and anthropology, Hockett practiced musical performance and composition. Hockett composed a full-length opera called The Love of Doña Rosita which was based on a play by Federico García Lorca and premiered at Ithaca College by the Ithaca Opera.

Hockett and his wife Shirley were vital leaders in the development of the Cayuga Chamber Orchestra in Ithaca, New York. In appreciation of the Hocketts' hard work and dedication to the Ithaca community, Ithaca College established the Charles F. Hockett Music Scholarship, the Shirley and Chas Hockett Chamber Music Concert Series, and the Hockett Family Recital Hall.

== View on linguistics ==
In his paper "A Note on Structure", he proposes that linguistics can be seen as "a game and as a science." A linguist as a player in the game of languages has the freedom to experiment on all utterances of a language, but must ensure that "all the utterances of the corpus must be taken into account." Late in his career, he was known for his stinging criticism of Chomskyan linguistics.

== Key contributions ==
=== Criticisms of Noam Chomsky and the Generative Programme ===
Hockett was initially receptive to Generative grammar, hailing Chomsky's Syntactic Structures as "one of only four major breakthroughs in the history of modern linguistics" (1965). After carefully examining the generative school's proposed innovations in Linguistics, Hockett decided that this approach was of little value. His book The State of the Art outlined his criticisms of the generative approach. In his paraphrase a key principle of the Chomskyan paradigm is that there are an infinite number of grammatical sentences in any particular language.

The grammar of a language is a finite system that characterizes an infinite set of (well-formed) sentences. More specifically, the grammar of a language is a well-defined system by definition not more powerful than a universal Turing machine (and, in fact, surely a great deal weaker).

The crux of Hockett's rebuttal is that the set of grammatical sentences in a language is not infinite, but rather ill-defined. Hockett proposes that "no physical system is well-defined".

Later in "Where the tongue slips, there slip I" he writes as follows.

It is currently fashionable to assume that, underlying the actual more or less bumbling speech behavior of any human being, there is a subtle and complicated but determinate linguistic "competence": a sentence-generating device whose design can only be roughly guessed at by any techniques so far available to us. This point of view makes linguistics very hard and very erudite, so that anyone who actually does discover facts about underlying "competence" is entitled to considerable kudos.

Within this popular frame of reference, a theory of "performance" -- of the "generation of speech" -- must take more or less the following form. If a sentence is to be uttered aloud, or even thought silently to oneself, it must first be built by the internal "competence" of the speaker, the functioning of which is by definition such that the sentence will be legal ("grammatical") in every respect. But that is not enough; the sentence as thus constructed must then be performed, either overtly so that others may hear it, or covertly so that it is perceived only by the speaker himself. It is in this second step that blunders may appear. That which is generated by the speaker's internal "competence"is what the speaker "intends to say," and is the only real concern of linguistics: blunders in actually performed speech are instructions from elsewhere. Just if there are no such intrusions is what is performed an instance of "smooth speech".

I believe this view is unmitigated nonsense, unsupported by any empirical evidence of any sort. In its place, I propose the following.

All speech, smooth as well as blunderful, can be and must be accounted for essentially in terms of the three mechanisms we have listed: analogy, blending, and editing. An individual's language, at a given moment, is a set of habits--that is, of analogies, where different analogies are in conflict, one may appear as a constraint on the working of another. Speech actualizes habits--and changes the habits as it does so. Speech reflects awareness of norms; but norms are themselves entirely a matter of analogy (that is, of habit), not some different kind of thing.

Despite his criticisms, Hockett always expressed gratitude to the generative school for seeing real problems in the preexisting approaches.

There are many situations in which bracketing does not serve to disambiguate. As already noted, words that belong together cannot always be spoken together, and when they are not, bracketing is difficult or impossible. In the 1950s this drove some grammarians to drink and other to transformations, but both are only anodynes, not answers

=== Design features of language ===
One of Hockett's most important contributions was his development of the design-feature approach to comparative linguistics. He attempted to distinguish the similarities and differences among animal communication systems and human language.

Hockett initially developed seven features, which were published in the 1959 paper “Animal ‘Languages’ and Human Language.” However, after many revisions, he settled on 13 design-features in the Scientific American "The Origin of Speech."

Hockett argued that while every communication system has some of the 13 design features, only human, spoken language has all 13 features. In turn, that differentiates human spoken language from animal communication and other human communication systems such as written language.

==== Hockett's 13 design features of language ====
1. Vocal-Auditory Channel: Much of human language is performed using the vocal tract and auditory channel. Hockett viewed this as an advantage for human primates because it allowed for the ability to participate in other activities while simultaneously communicating through spoken language.
2. Broadcast transmission and directional reception: All human language can be heard if it is within range of another person's auditory channel. Additionally, a listener has the ability to determine the source of a sound by binaural direction finding.
3. Rapid Fading (transitoriness): Wave forms of human language dissipate over time and do not persist. A hearer can receive specific auditory information only at the time it is spoken.
4. Interchangeability: A person has the ability to speak and hear the same signal. Anything that a person is able to hear can be reproduced in spoken language.
5. Total Feedback: Speakers can hear themselves speak and monitor their speech production and internalize what they are producing by language.
6. Specialization: Human language sounds are specialized for communication. When dogs pant it is to cool themselves off. When humans speak, it is to transmit information.
7. Semanticity: Specific signals can be matched with a specific meaning.
8. Arbitrariness: There is no limitation to what can be communicated about and no specific or necessary connection between the sounds used and the message being sent.
9. Discreteness: Phonemes can be placed in distinct categories which differentiate them from one another, like the distinct sound of /p/ versus /b/.
10. Displacement: People can refer to things in space and time and communicate about things that are not present.
11. Productivity: People can create new and unique meanings of utterances from previously existing utterances and sounds.
12. Traditional Transmission: Human language is not completely innate, and acquisition depends in part on the learning of a language.
13. Duality of patterning: Meaningless phonic segments (phonemes) are combined to make meaningful words, which, in turn, are combined again to make sentences.

While Hockett believed that all communication systems, animal and human alike, share many of these features, only human language contains all 13 design features. Additionally, traditional transmission, and duality of patterning are key to human language.

==== Design feature representation in other communication systems ====
Honeybees

Foraging honey bees communicate with other members of their hive when they have discovered a relevant source of pollen, nectar, or water. In an effort to convey information about the location and the distance of such resources, honeybees participate in a particular figure-eight dance known as the waggle dance.

In Hockett's "The Origin of Speech", he determined that the honeybee communication system of the waggle dance holds the following design features:

1. Broadcast Transmission and Directional Reception: By the use of this dance, honeybees are able to send out a signal that informs other members of the hive as to what direction the source of food, or water can be located.
2. Semanticity: Evidence that the specific signals of a communication system can be matched with specific meanings is apparent because other members of the hive are able to locate the food source after a performance of the waggle dance.
3. Displacement: Foraging honeybees can communicate about a resource that is not currently present within the hive.
4. Productivity: Waggle dances change based on the direction, amount, and type of resource.

Gibbons are small apes in the family Hylobatidae. While they share the same kingdom, phylum, class, and order of humans and are relatively close to man, Hockett distinguishes between the gibbon communication system and human language by noting that gibbons are devoid of the last four design features.

Gibbons possess the first nine design features, but do not possess the last four (displacement, productivity, traditional transmission, and duality of patterning).

1. Displacement, according to Hockett, appears to be lacking in the vocal signaling of apes.
2. Productivity does not exist among gibbons because if any vocal sound is produced, it is one of a finite set of repetitive and familiar calls.
3. Hockett supports the idea that humans learn language extra genetically through the process of traditional transmission. Hockett distinguishes gibbons from humans by stating that despite any similarities in communication among a species of apes, one cannot attribute these similarities to acquisition through the teaching and learning (traditional transmission) of signals; the only explanation must be a genetic basis.
4. Finally, duality of patterning explains a human's ability to create multiple meanings from somewhat meaningless sounds. For example, the phonemes /t/, /a/, /c/ can be used to create the words "cat," "tack," and "act." Hockett states that no other Hominoid communication system besides human language maintains this ability.

=== Later additions to the features ===
In a report published in 1968 with anthropologist and scientist Stuart A. Altmann, Hockett derived three more Design Features, bringing the total to 16. These are the additional three:

14. Prevarication: A speaker can say falsehoods, lies, and meaningless statements.
15. Reflexiveness: Language can be used communicate about the very system it is, and language can discuss language
16. Learnability: A speaker of a language can learn another language

Cognitive scientist and linguist at the University of Sussex Larry Trask offered an alternative term and definition for number 14, Prevarication:

14. (a) Stimulus Freedom: One can choose to say anything nothing in any given situation

==== Relationship between design features and animal communication ====
Chomsky theorized that humans are unique in the animal world because of their ability to utilize Design Feature 5: Total Feedback, or recursive grammar. This includes being able to correct oneself and insert explanatory or even non sequitur statements into a sentence, without breaking stride, and keeping proper grammar throughout.

While there have been studies attempting to disprove Chomsky, Marcus states that, "An intriguing possibility is that the capacity to recognize recursion might be found only in species that can acquire new patterns of vocalization, for example, songbirds, humans and perhaps some cetaceans." This is in response to a study performed by psychologist Timothy Gentner of the University of California at San Diego. Gentner's study found that starling songbirds use recursive grammar to identify “odd” statements within a given “song.” However, the study does not necessarily debunk Chomsky's observation because it has not yet been proven that songbirds have the semantic ability to generalize from patterns.

There is also thought that symbolic thought is necessary for grammar-based speech, and thus Homo Erectus and all preceding “humans” would have been unable to comprehend modern speech. Rather, their utterances would have been halting and even quite confusing to us, today.

The : Phonetics Laboratory Faculty of Linguistics, Philology and Phonetics published the following chart, detailing how Hockett's (and Altmann's) Design Features fit into other forms of communication, in animals:

Feature	Crickets	Bee dancing	Western meadowlark song	Gibbon calls	Signing apes	Alex, a grey parrot	Paralinguistic phenomena	Human sign languages	Spoken language
Vocal-Auditory Channel	Auditory, not vocal	No	Yes	Yes	No	Yes	Yes	No	Yes
Broadcast Transmission and Directional Reception	Yes	Yes	Yes	Yes	Yes	Yes	Yes	Yes	Yes
Rapid Fading	Yes (repeating)	?	Yes	Yes (repeating)	Yes	Yes	Yes	Yes	Yes
Interchangeability	Limited	Limited	?	Yes	Yes	Yes	Largely Yes	Yes	Yes
Total Feedback	Yes	?	Yes	Yes	No	Yes	Yes	No	Yes
Specialization	Yes?	?	Yes	Yes	Yes	Yes	Yes?	Yes	Yes
Semanticity	No?	Yes	In Part	Yes	Yes	Yes	Yes?	Yes	Yes
Arbitrariness	?	No	If semantic, Yes	Yes	Largely Yes	Yes	In Part	Largely Yes	Yes
Discreteness	Yes?	No	?	Yes	Yes	Yes	Largely No	Yes	Yes
Displacement	–	Yes, always	?	No	Yes	No	In Part	Yes, often	Yes, often
Productivity	No	Yes	?	No	Debatable	Limited	Yes	Yes	Yes
Traditional Transmission	No?	Probably not	?	?	Limited	Limited	Yes	Yes	Yes
Duality of Patterning	?	No	?	No (Cotton-top Tamarin: Yes)	Yes	Yes	No	Yes	Yes
Prevarication	–	–	–	–	Yes	No	–	Yes	Yes
Reflexiveness	–	–	–	–	No?	No	–	Yes	Yes
Learnability	–	–	–	–	Yes	Yes	–	Yes	Yes

== Selected works ==
- 1939: "Potowatomi Syntax", Language 15: 235–248.
- 1942: "A System of Descriptive Phonology", Language 18: 3-21.
- 1944: Spoken Chinese; Basic Course. With C. Fang. Holt, New York.
- 1947: "Peiping phonology", in: Journal of the American Oriental Society, 67, pp. 253–267. [= Martin Joos (ed.), Readings in Linguistics, vol. I, 4th edition. Chicago and London 1966, pp. 217–228].
- 1947: "Problems of morphemic analysis", in: Language, 24, pp. 414–41. [= Readings in Linguistics, vol. I, pp. 229–242].
- 1948: "Biophysics, linguistics, and the unity of science", in: American Scientist, 36, pp. 558–572.
- 1950: "Peiping morphophonemics", in: Language, 26, pp. 63–85. [= Readings in Linguistics, vol. I, pp. 315–328].
- 1954: "Two models of grammatical description", in: Word, 10, pp. 210–234. [= Readings in Linguistics, vol. I, pp. 386–399].
- 1955: A Manual of Phonology. Indiana University Publications in Anthropology and Linguistics 11.
- 1958: A Course in Modern Linguistics. The Macmillan Company: New York.
- 1960: "The Origin of Speech". in Scientific American, 203, pp. 89–97.
- 1961: "Linguistic Elements and Their Relation" in Language, 37: 29–53.
- 1967: The State of the Art. The Haag: Mouton
- 1973: Man's Place in Nature. New York: McGraw-Hill.
- 1977: The View From Language. Athens: The University of Georgia Press.
- 1987: Refurbishing Our Foundations. Amsterdam: John Benjamins.

== See also ==
- Animal communication
- Design features of language
- Language acquisition
- Linguistic anthropology
- Linguistic universals
- Origin of language
- Origin of speech
