= Harvey Sussman =

American linguist

- Education: University of Wisconsin (PhD & MS); Queens College (CUNY) (BA)
- Known for: works on speech production, speech perception, language and the brain, and neurolinguistics
- Scientific career
- Fields: Phonology, Phonetics
- Institutions: University of Texas at Austin
- Academic advisors: Karl U. Smith
- Doctoral students: Golnaz Modarresi Ghavami
- Website: https://csd.utexas.edu/faculty/harvey-sussman

Harvey M. Sussman is an American linguist and professor of linguistics at the University of Texas at Austin. He is known for his research on speech production, speech perception, language and the brain, and neurolinguistics. His publications span such topics as speech motor control, coarticulatory dynamics, hemispheric specialization, stuttering, developmental apraxia, aphasia, and most recently, neuronal modeling of phonological language acquisition.

Sussman has received the Editors' Award (from the Journal of Speech & Hearing Research), Teaching Excellence award and College of Communication Research Award.
