= Sam Sussman =

American author (born 1991)

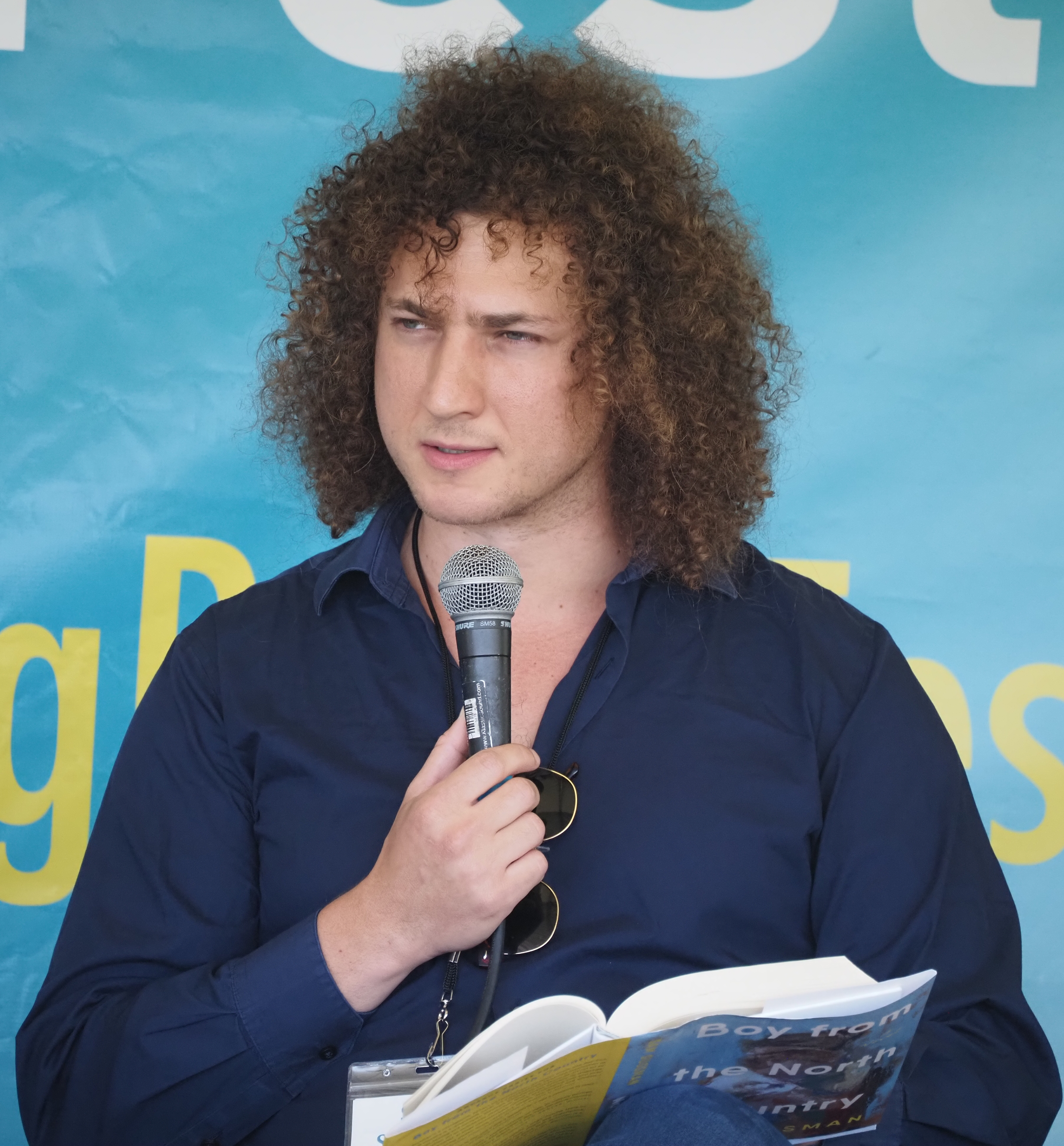
- at the 2026 Gaithersburg Book Festival
- Born: 1991 (age 34–35)
- Education: Swarthmore College (B.A.) University of Oxford (M.Phil)
- Occupation: Writer
- Notable work: Boy From the North Country (2025)
- Website: www.samevansussman.org

Sam Sussman is an American writer. He is best known for his debut novel, Boy From the North Country, which was a finalist for the National Jewish Book Awards in Fiction and Debut Fiction. as well as the best debut novel of Fall 2025 by Oprah Daily.

== Early life and education ==
Sussman was born in 1991, and grew up in Goshen, New York.Sussman has said that literature was "a love language between my mother and me."

Sussman studied one year at SUNY Binghamton and one year at Christ Church, Oxford, before transferring to Swarthmore College, from which he earned a Bachelor of Arts. He later attended Oxford University, from which he earned a Master of Philosophy in international studies. While at Oxford, Sussman was an active member of the Oxford Union.

== Career ==
Sussman has taught writing and literature seminars in England, India, Peru, and Chile. While living in England, Sussman won the BAFTA New Writing Award for original screenplay. He is a member of PEN America and has participated in the PEN World Voices Festival of International Literature three times.

=== Boy from the North Country (2025) ===
Boy From the North Country is an autofictional novel based on Sussman's Harper's Magazine memoir essay, "The Silent Type: On (Possibly) Being Bob Dylan's Son." The novel was published September 16, 2025, by Penguin Press. The novel was well received by critics, including starred reviews from Booklist, Kirkus Reviews, and Publishers Weekly.

=== Human rights activism ===
Sussman co-founded Extend, an NGO that brings Americans to Israel-Palestine to meet human rights activists working toward a democratic future.

== Personal life ==
Sussman has lived in Berlin and Jerusalem. As of 2025, he lived in both his childhood home in Goshen, New York and an apartment in Manhattan, where his mother first lived in the early 1970s and much of Boy from the North Country takes place. Dylan wrote parts of Blood on the Tracks in the apartment.
