= Abraham Sussmann =

Jewish-English writer

Abraham ben Joseph Sussmann (Hebrew: אברהם בן יוסף זוסמאן) was a shoḥet and writer active in London in the first half of the 19th century. He was the author of commentary on Yoreh De'ah in four parts, entitled Sifte Zahav, Adne Zahav, Lebushe Tevu‘ah, and Lebushe Serad, respectively. He also compiled an index to Lebushe Serad under the title Be’er Yosef with two supplements: Ḥezqat ha-Bayit and Maẓẓevet Me’ir Yosef (Königsberg, 1853).
