= Displacement (linguistics) =

Capability to tell about things not present

In linguistics, displacement is the capability of language to communicate about things that are not immediately present (spatially or temporally); i.e., things that are either not here or are not here now.

In 1960, Charles F. Hockett proposed displacement as one of 13 design features of language that distinguish human language from animal communication systems (ACSs):

Man is apparently almost unique in being able to talk about things that are remote in space or time (or both) from where the talking goes on. This feature—"displacement"—seems to be definitely lacking in the vocal signaling of man's closest relatives, though it does occur in bee-dancing.

== In animal communication systems ==
Honeybees use the waggle dance to communicate the location of a patch of flowers suitable for foraging. The degree of displacement in this example remains limited when compared to human language. A bee can only communicate the location of the most recent food source it has visited. It cannot communicate an idea about a food source at a specific point in the past, nor can it speculate about food sources in the future. In addition, displacement in the waggle dance is restricted by the language's lack of creativity and productivity. The bees can express direction and distance, but it has been experimentally determined that they lack a sign for "above". It is also doubtful that bees can communicate about non-existent nectar for the purpose of deception. Consequently, in honeybee communication, the potential for displacement is limited, but it is there insofar as they have the ability to communicate about something not currently present (i.e., something that is spatially removed).

Ants have been observed sending out scouts to patrol for food items, and coming back for other workers if the food found is too large to bring to the nest by the finder alone; for example, a dead caterpillar that is too heavy. This again would involve displacement by communicating outside of the here and now. Recruitment has also been observed by the African weaver ant Oecophylla longinoda for the purpose of communicating new food sources, emigration to new sites, and for defense against intruders. Researchers have described no less than five distinct systems to fulfill these functions in this species. The ants communicate using a system composed of olfactory or scent clues from several glands together with body movements. The animals will use antennation, body jerking, and mouth-opening, and will combine these clues with the application of the scent trails or scent release to pass on information regarding resources or intruders.

Ravens (Corvus corax) have been observed to recruit other ravens to large feeding sites, such as to the carcass of an animal. However, their motivation for recruiting appears less obvious, and the specifics of their communication system are more elusive. Still, it has been documented that ravens must have such a system, as their patterns of gathering at sites clearly indicate that they must have been informed of the presence of the resource. It is believed that non-mated ravens call in a group of other non-mated birds to be able to feed and not get chased away by mated territorial pairs of established ravens.

In addition to honeybees, ants, and ravens, the greater honeyguide (Indicator indicator) achieves displacement when it signals to humans the location of distant honeybee colonies. This fascinating mutualistic relationship between people and a wild bird, and the communicative system underlying the partnership, has been studied by anthropologists and ornithologists.

== Importance in evolution of language ==
The need to convey information using displacement has been suspected to have been the evolutionary pressure leading to language development in humans, as outlined by Derek Bickerton in Adam's Tongue. The pressure of such need is present in species with a foraging strategy that presents the challenge of directing members of its group to a food source too large to be utilized singly or in small numbers, requiring recruitment of assistance.

It's only when you fully appreciate what displacement means, how the absence of displacement is not just a casual feature of ACSs but a crucial defining feature of pre-human minds, that you can start getting the complete picture.

— Bickerton, page 217

The unique environmental need selecting for a communication system capable for displacement in humans or their direct ancestors is not identified, but hypotheses include Bickerton's theory of small groups finding large herbivore carcasses, and needing the assistance from other small groups of humans to defend against other dangerous scavengers (large cats, hyenas) competing for the same source of food. Language development most certainly did not stop there—since otherwise bees or ants would have comparable communication systems to humans—but this is where it is hypothesized to have begun, giving human ancestors the ability to take communication out of the here and now.

== See also ==
- Bee learning and communication
- Corvus corax – a species of ravens which displays displacement
- Design features of language
- Homo erectus – possible use of language in early humans
- Weaver ant social structure
