= Karl U. Smith =

American physiologist and psychologist

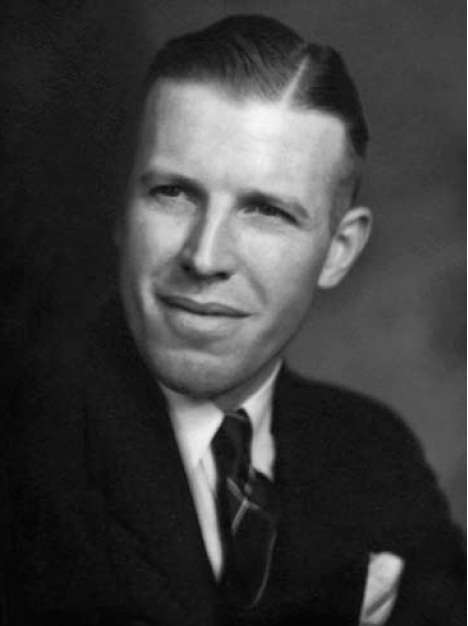
Karl U. Smith

Karl Ulrich Smith (1 May 1907 in Zanesville, Ohio – 22 June 1994 in Lake Wales, Florida) was an American physiologist, psychologist and behavioral cybernetician.

He dealt among others with the interaction between humans and technology and played a crucial role in the development of human factors which deals with the safe and humane or healthy design of products, work equipment and work systems.

== Works ==
Books

- Smith, Karl U; Smith, William M (1958). The behavior of man; introduction to psychology. New York: Holt, Rinehart and Winston.
- Smith, Karl U; Smith, William M (1958). Workbook for the behavior of man : introduction to psychology. New York: Holt, Rinehart and Winston.
- Smith, Karl U (1962). Delayed sensory feedback and behavior. Philadelphia; London : W.B. Saunders Co.
- Smith, Karl U; Smith, William M (1962). Perception and motion : an analysis of space-structured behavior. Philadelphia: Saunders.
- Smith, Karl U; Smith, Margaret Foltz (1966). Cybernetic principles of learning and educational design. New York: Holt, Rinehart and Winston.
- Smith, Karl U; Smith, Margaret Foltz (1973). Psychology; an introduction to behavior science. Boston: Little, Brown.

Articles

- Smith, K. U. (1972) Social tracking in the development of educational skills, American Journal of Optometry and Physiological Optics (1972) 49: 50-60
- Smith, T. J., Henning, R. A. and Smith, K. U.: Sources of performance variability. In: Salvendy, G. and Karwowski, W.: Design of work and development of personnel in advanced manufacturing New York: Wiley (1994) pp. 273–354
- Smith, T. J., Henning, R. A. and Smith, K. U.: Performance of hybrid automated systems - a social cybernetic analysis In: International Journal of Human Factors in Manufacturing. New York: Wiley (1995) 5(1): 29–51
- Smith, K.U.: Physiological and Sensory Feedback of the Motor System: Neural-Metabolic Integration for Energy Regulation in Behavior. In: Maser, J. D.: Efferent organization and the integration of behavior. New York: Academic Press (1973) pp. 20–66
- Smith, K.U. und Putz, V.: Feedback factors in steering and tracking behavior. In: Journal of Applied Psychology. (1970) 54(2): 176-183
- Smith, K.U. und Putz, V.: Feedback analysis of learning and performance in steering and tracking behavior . In: Journal of Applied Psychology. (1970) 54(3): 239-247
- Henry, J. P., Junas, R. and Smith, K. U.: Experimental cybernetic analysis of delayed feedback of breath-pressure control. In: American Journal of Physical Medicine. (1967) 46(4): 1317-1331
- Smith, K.U.: Cybernetic Psychology. In: Singer, R. N. (Ed.): The Psychomotor Domain: Movement Behavior. Philadelphia: Lea & Febiger, 1972.pp. 285–348
- Smith, T. J., and Smith, K. U.: Cybernetic factors in motor performance and development. In: Goodman, D.; Wilberg, R.B. and Franks, I.M. (Eds.): Differing Perspectives in Motor Learning, Memory, and Control. Amsterdam: Elsevier. Advances in Psychology 1985 27:239-283
- Smith, K. U. and Henry, J.: Cybernetic foundations of rehabilitative science. American Journal of Physical Medicine (1967) 46(1):379-467
- Smith, K. U. and Smith, T. J. (1970) Feedback mechanisms of athletic skill and learning. In L. Smith, Ed., Motor skill and learning (pp. 83–195). Chicago: Athletic Institute.
- Smith, K.U.: Physiological and Sensory Feedback of the Motor System: Neural-Metabolic Integration for Energy Regulation in Behavior. In: Maser, J. D.: Efferent organization and the integration of behavior. New York: Academic Press (1973) pp. 20–66
- Sauter, S. L.: A Cybernetic analysis of the behavioral-respiratory modulation of heart rate and heart-rate variability. PhD. Dissertation. Wisconsin: University of Wisconsin-Madison (1975)
- Smith, T. J. and Smith, K. U.: Feedback-control mechanisms of human behavior. In: Salvendy, G. (Ed.). Handbook of Human Factors. New York: Wiley (1987) pp. 251–293.
- Smith, T.J., and Smith, K.U.: Behavioral cybernetic basis of cognitive performance. Experimental and theoretical analysis. In: Ergonomics (Special Issue on Methodological Issues in Cognitive Ergonomics). 1988.
- Gould, J. and Smith, K. U.: Angular displacement of visual feedback in motion and learning. In: Perceptual and Motor Skills (1963) 17:699-710
