= Andrew Susman =

American communications executive (born 1968)

Andrew R. Susman
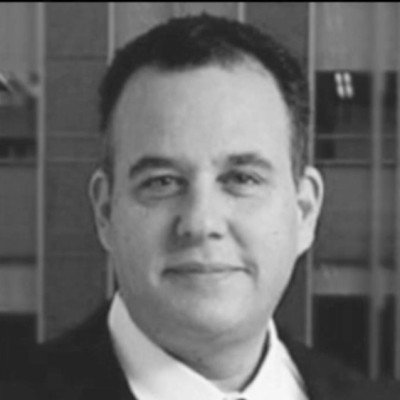
- Born: May 26, 1968 (age 58); St. Louis, Missouri
- Occupations: Principal Member, New Value Associates, LLC; President, Institute for Advertising Ethics; CEO & Co-Founder of Studio One Networks

Andrew Susman is an American communications executive. He co-founded and was the CEO of Studio One Networks. Studio One has been called "one of, if not the pioneer in the field of digital content marketing services," now a $200 billion industry. He lives mainly in Manhattan and the Midwest.

== Career ==
Susman was CEO of Studio One Networks, where he built a network of over 2500 websites with partners including AOL, Yahoo!, NBC, CBS, FOX, ABC, and marketers including Procter & Gamble, Home Depot, American Express, Kellogg's, Ford, and the White House. On October 7, 2014, Susman's company, Studio One Networks was acquired. Prior to its acquisition, Studio One was cited by Procter & Gamble at the Federal Trade Commission as the gold standard in consumer transparency.

Susman is President of the Institute for Advertising Ethics and through New Value Associates, is involved with alternative projects and companies. Susman is on the Advertising Educational Foundation Board of Directors, a unit of the Association of National Advertisers. Susman founded and was co-chair of the Advertising Transparency & Trust Forum, a multilateral industry working group formed in a meeting at the United Nations on March 30, 2017, to restore transparency and trust in the industry.

Susman previously was an executive at Time Inc. New Media and Young & Rubicam.

== Susman Family ==
Susman was born into the Susman family of St. Louis, Missouri, the son of Frank Susman (Susman, Schermer, Rimmel & Shifrin). Mr. Susman argued six cases before the U.S. Supreme Court, and is the only attorney in history to have been invited or permitted to argue two separate cases before the Supreme Court on the same day. Susman was known for supporting country over party. In one example, in March 1976, Susman argued against John Danforth, the Republican Attorney General of Missouri, in the U.S. Supreme Court. Then, six months later, in October 1976, back in Missouri, Susman joined with August Busch III to form "Democrats for Danforth." On November 2, 1976, Mr. Danforth was elected and served for three terms as Republican Senator for Missouri, prior to his service as Ambassador to the United Nations.

Susman's mother, Marilyn Susman is a Professor Emerita of Psychology at Loyola University, and Fulbright Scholar of the United States Department of State. She studied under Abraham Maslow.

Susman's grandfather, Earl Susman (Susman, Willer, Rimmel & Parker), was of counsel on Shelley vs. Kraemer, a landmark U.S. Supreme Court ruling, and argued by Thurgood Marshall, which made housing discrimination illegal. Susman was President of the Jewish Federation of St. Louis.

In addition to the United States Supreme Court, the family has also served in two Anglo-American courts. Notable family members include Louis Susman, the former Ambassador to the Court of St. James (United Kingdom), nominated by Barack Obama, and Karen Hantze Susman, winner of the 1962 women's singles title on Centre Court at the Wimbledon Championship.

In Africa, Susman Brothers founded, owned, and operated several large businesses including mining interests, ranches, and agribusinesses. The Susman business empire lasted over a century by overcoming logistical difficulties, physically challenging obstacles, and political changes. Susman Brothers developed an extensive trading and transport network stretching from Botswana to the Democratic Republic of the Congo. In 1925, Harry Susman and King Litunga Yeta III, companions and partners, jointly received the Prince of Wales on the occasion of his visit.

== Personal life ==
Susman was put forward by Martha Nussbaum as a visiting student of ancient philosophy and rhetoric at Oxford University, studying under J.L. Ackrill, an English philosopher and classicist, and Fellow of the British Academy, Margaret Hubbard, who has been described as "one of the most distinguished classical scholars of the modern age," and Peter Birks, Queen's Counsel, who advanced the English law of Restitution, and is often considered to have been one of the greatest English legal scholars of the 20th century.

Susman earned a Bachelor of Arts in Ethics and Political Philosophy at Brown University. Susman earned a Diploma of Business Studies at the London School of Economics, where he was Class President. Susman attended the Buckley School of Public Speaking and Disciplined Thinking, studying under Reid Buckley and earning the Demosthenes Medal. A Buckley conservative, he is a New York State Conservative Party Committee member. Despite receiving an invitation from the Republican Party to run for Manhattan Borough President, Susman opted to prioritize his existing responsibilities.
