= Denise L. Herzing =

Zoologist

Denise L. Herzing is the founder and Research Director of the Wild Dolphin Project, a non-profit which funds the study of the natural behaviors and communication of Atlantic spotted dolphins in the wild.

Herzing has earned her Ph.D. in Behavioral Biology/Environmental Studies, her M.A. in Behavioral Biology, and her B.S. in Marine Zoology

Herzing's aim is to achieve two-way communication between humans and dolphins. She hopes to use a wearable underwater computer to record and make dolphin sounds. The computer aims to create synthesized dolphin sounds that can be established between sound and object. The object is to enable dolphins to imitate the sound in order to make requests from people.

In the field of dolphin intelligence and communication, Herzing has recorded observations of dolphins expressing teaching behaviors. She also worked as part of a team that developed a new camera/hydrophone system which allows researchers to identify which dolphin on a recording made which sound. This device pairs a video camera with three hydrophones, recordings from the device can be used to assess the directionality of a sound moving through water. Herzing has described a method for unbiased quantification of nonhuman intelligence which can be applied to other animals as well as dolphins.
