= Björn E. Lindblom =

Swedish linguist and phonetician (born 1934)

Björn E. Lindblom (born 19 June 1934 in Stockholm) is a Swedish linguist and phonetician known for his contributions to empiricist phonology and phonetics (as opposed to chomskyan phonology). He teaches at Stockholm University and University of Texas at Austin. He is married to Ann-Mari Lindblom and has two children: Ann Lindblom, dietician, (born 1960) and John Lindblom, journalist, (born 1965).

== Education ==
- Fil mag, Stockholm University, 1960, English, Romance lg's
- Fil lic, Uppsala University, 1963, Phonetics
- Fil dr (≈ Ph D), Lund University, 1968, Phonetics

== Sources ==
- Lindblom's publications
- comments on Björn Lindblom's 'phonetic invariance and the adaptive nature of speech'
- Lindblom's works and publications
- Phonetics and the explanatory depth of phonological descriptions
- For Alvin M. Liberman
- Phonetica (Dedicated to Bjorn Lindblom on his 65th birthday)
