= Studio One (company) =

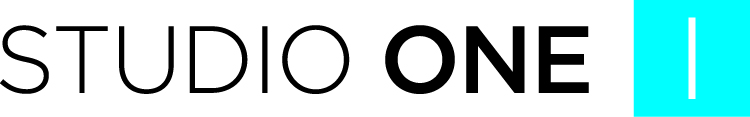
- Formerly: Studio One Networks
- Type: Private
- Industry: Content Marketing
- Founder: Bob Blackmore and Andrew Susman
- Headquarters: New York City
- Key people: Andrew Susman President and CEO
- Services: Content Creation and Optimization, Editorial Review, Social Promotion, Measurement & Analytics, Writer Management
- Number of employees: 51-200
- Website: www.studioone.com

Studio One is a content marketing company based in New York City. Studio One creates branded or brand-aligned content in a variety of formats that are distributed across a network of websites. On October 7, 2014, Studio One was acquired by The CHR Group, a global marketing services holding company headquartered in New York City.

== Founding ==
Bob Blackmore and Andrew Susman founded Studio One, formally known as Studio One Networks, in 1998. American Honda was among Studio One’s first clients. In 1999, Studio One and American Honda announced plans to produce and distribute the first series of syndicated programs for the Internet.

== 2000s ==
In 2009, Studio One formed Studio One Networks Ventures, which makes equity investments in media and technology companies in exchange for participation in the company's programming. In March 2010 Studio One’s websites had about 200 million unique monthly visitors. In 2012, Studio One launched the "Content Asset Management Platform" (CAMP) as a way for companies to track brand content performance. Also, that year Studio One started a journalist certification program. The company has developed content for Intel, Pantene, Symantec and Bridgestone USA. In 2009 the company established Studio One Networks Ventures, which made equity investments in media and technology companies.
