= Hockett's design features =

Set of features that characterize human language

Hockett's design features are a set of features that characterize human language and set it apart from animal communication. They were defined by the linguist Charles F. Hockett in the 1960s. He called these characteristics the design features of language. Hockett originally believed there to be 13 design features. While primate communication utilizes the first 9 features, Hockett believed that the final 4 features (displacement, productivity, cultural transmission, and duality) were reserved for humans. Hockett later added prevarication, reflexiveness, and learnability to the list as uniquely human characteristics. He asserted that even the most basic human languages possess these 16 features.

== Design features of language ==
=== Vocal-auditory channel ===
Vocal-auditory channel refers to the idea that speaking/hearing is the mode humans use for language. When Hockett first defined this feature, it did not take sign language into account, which reflects the ideology of orality that was prevalent during the time. This feature has since been modified to include other channels of language, such as tactile-visual or chemical-olfactory.

=== Broadcast transmission and directional reception ===
When humans speak, sounds are transmitted in all directions; however, listeners perceive the direction from which the sounds are coming. Similarly, signers broadcast to potentially anyone within the line of sight, while those watching see who is signing. This is characteristic of most forms of human and animal communication.

=== Transitoriness ===
Also called rapid fading, transitoriness refers to the temporary quality of language. Language sounds exist for only a brief period of time, after which they are no longer perceived. Sound waves quickly disappear once a speaker stops speaking. This is also true of signs. In contrast, other forms of communication such as writing and Inka khipus (knot-tying) are more permanent.

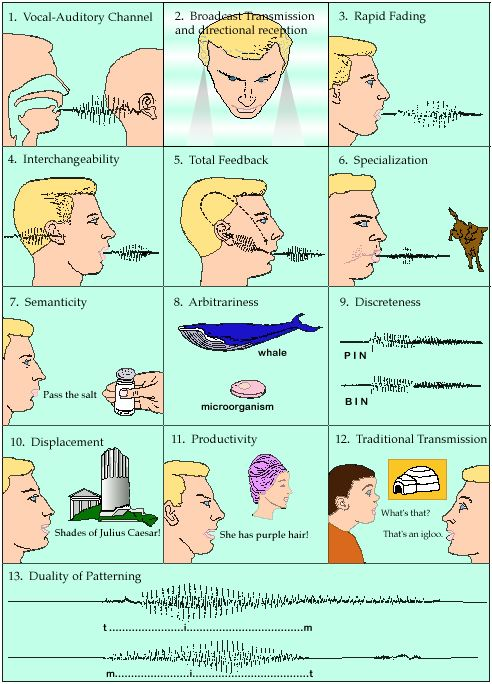

=== Interchangeability ===
Interchangeability refers to the idea that humans can give and receive identical linguistic signals; humans are not limited in the types of messages they can say/hear. One can say "I am a boy" even if one is a girl. This is not to be confused with lying (prevarication): the importance is that a speaker can physically create any and all messages regardless of their truth or relation to the speaker. In other words, anything that one can hear, one can also say.

Not all species possess this feature. For example, in order to communicate their status, queen ants produce chemical scents that no other ants can produce (see animal communication below).

=== Complete Feedback ===
Speakers of a language can hear their own speech and can control and modify what they are saying as they say it. Similarly, signers see, feel, and control their signing.

=== Specialization ===
The purpose of linguistic signals is communication and not some other biological function. When humans speak or sign, it is generally intentional.

An example of non-specialized communication is dog panting. When a dog pants, it often communicates to its owner that it is hot or thirsty; however, the dog pants in order to cool itself off. This is a biological function, and the communication is a secondary matter.

=== Semanticity ===
Specific sound signals are directly tied to specific meanings, and there are relatively fixed associations between messages and what they refer to.

=== Arbitrariness ===
Languages are generally made up of both arbitrary and iconic symbols. In spoken languages, iconicity takes the form of onomatopoeia (e.g., "murmur" in English, "māo" [cat] in Mandarin). For the vast majority of other symbols, there is no intrinsic or logical connection between a sound form (signal) and what it refers to. Almost all names a human language attributes an object are thus arbitrary: the word "car" is nothing like an actual car. Spoken words are really nothing like the objects they represent. This is further demonstrated by the fact that different languages attribute very different names to the same object. Signed languages are transmitted visually and this allows for a certain degree of iconicity ("cup", "me," "up/down", etc. in ASL). For example, in the ASL sign HOUSE, the hands are flat and touch in a way that resembles the roof and walls of a house. (Note: This sign can be non-iconic if said house is not shaped like that. Depicting Verbs (formerly thought to be classifiers) are meant to modify (give more information about) the actual visual appearance or process. For instance, the sign used for the generic idea of "box" is different from the one used for "PO box" because the latter has specific shapes that often do not conform to other items sharing this label; the sign and depicting verb for "tree" does not encompass bamboo trees.) However, many other signs are not iconic, and the relationship between form and meaning is arbitrary. Thus, while Hockett did not account for the possibility of non-arbitrary form-meaning relationships, the principle still generally applies.

=== Discreteness ===
Linguistic representations can be broken down into small discrete units which combine with each other in rule-governed ways. They are perceived categorically, not continuously. For example, English marks number with the plural morpheme /s/, which can be added to the end of nearly any noun. The plural morpheme is perceived categorically, not continuously: one cannot express smaller or larger quantities by varying how loudly one pronounces the /s/. Loudness can be a discrete category, as a form of stress, while the more continuous and impressionistic variance in loudness expressed with words like whisper and shout are considered paralanguage.

=== Displacement ===
Displacement refers to the idea that humans can talk about things that are not physically present or that do not even exist. Speakers can talk about the past and the future, and can express hopes and dreams. A human's speech is not limited to here and now. Displacement is one of the features that separates human language from other forms of primate communication.

=== Productivity ===
Productivity refers to the idea that language-users can create and understand novel utterances. Humans are able to produce an unlimited amount of utterances. Also related to productivity is the concept of grammatical patterning, which facilitates the use and comprehension of language. Language is not stagnant, but is constantly changing. New idioms are created all the time and the meaning of signals can vary depending on the context and situation.

=== Traditional transmission ===
Also known as cultural transmission, traditional transmission is the idea that, while humans are born with innate language capabilities, the specifics of given language(s) are acquired or learned after birth in a social setting. Significantly, language and culture are woven together in this construct, functioning hand in hand for language acquisition.

=== Duality of patterning ===
Meaningful messages are made up of distinct smaller meaningful units (words and morphemes) which themselves are made up of distinct smaller, meaningless units (phonemes).

=== Prevarication ===
Prevarication is the ability to lie or deceive. When using language, humans can make false or meaningless statements. This is an important distinction made of human communication, i.e. language as compared to animal communication. While animal communication can display a few other design features as proposed by Hockett, animal communication is unable to lie or make up something that does not exist or have referents.

=== Reflexiveness ===
Humans can use language to talk about language. Also a very defining feature of human language, reflexiveness is a trait not shared by animal communication. With reflexiveness, humans can describe what language is, talk about the structure of language, and discuss the idea of language with others using language.

=== Learnability ===
Language is teachable and learnable. In the same way, as a speaker learns their first language, the speaker is able to learn other languages. It is worth noting that young children learn language with competence and ease; however, language acquisition is constrained by a critical period such that it becomes more difficult once children pass a certain age.

== Design features in animal communication ==
Hockett distinguished language from communication. While almost all animals communicate in some way, a communication system is only considered language if it possesses all of the above characteristics. Some animal communication systems are impressively sophisticated in the sense that they possess a significant number of the design features as proposed by Hockett.

=== Ants ===
Ants make use of the chemical-olfactory channel of communication. Ants produce chemicals called pheromones, which are released through body glands and received by the tips of the antennae. Ants can produce up to twenty different pheromone scents, each a unique signal used to communicate things such as the location of food and danger, or even the need to defend or relocate the colony. When an ant is killed, it releases a pheromone that alerts others of potential danger. Pheromones also help ants distinguish family members from strangers. The queen ant has special pheromones which she uses to signal her status, orchestrate work, and let the colony know when they need to raise princesses or drones. Ants will even engage in warfare to protect the colony or a food source. This warfare involves tactics that resemble human warfare. Marauder ants will capture and hold down an enemy while another ant crushes it. Ants are loyal to their colony to the death; however, the queen will kill her own in order to be the last one standing. This level of "planning" among an animal species requires intricate communication.

=== Birds ===
Bird communication demonstrates many of the features: the vocal-auditory channel, broadcast transmission/directional reception, rapid fading, semanticity, and arbitrariness. Bird communication is divided into songs and calls. Songs are used primarily to attract mates, while calls are used to alert conspecifics of food and danger and coordinate movement with the flock. Calls are acoustically simple, while songs are longer and more complex. Bird communication is both discrete and non-discrete. Birds use syntax to arrange their songs, where musical notes act as phonemes. The order of the notes is important to the meaning of the song, thus indicating that discreteness exists. Bird communication is also continuous in the sense that it utilizes duration and frequency. However, the fact that birds have "phonemes" does not necessarily mean that they can infinitely combine them. Birds have a limited number of songs that they can produce. The male indigo bunting only has one song, while the brown thrasher can sing over 2000 songs. Birds even have unique dialects, depending on where they are from.

Two different bird species, the Southern Pied Blabber and the Japanese Tit have been observed to be using the duality of patterning, which is another feature thought to only be used by humans.

=== Honeybees ===
Honeybee communication is distinct from other forms of animal communication. Rather than vocal-auditory, bees use the space-movement channel to communicate. Honeybees use dances to communicate—the round dance, the waggle dance, and the transitional dance. Depending on the species, the round dance is used to communicate that food is 20–30 m from the hive, the waggle dance that food is 40–90 m from the hive, and the transitional dance that food is at a distance in between. To do the waggle dance, a bee moves in a zig-zag line and then loops back to the beginning of the line, forming a figure-eight. The direction of the line points to the food. The speed of the dance indicates the distance to the food. In this way, bee dancing is also continuous, rather than discrete. Their communication is also not arbitrary: They move in a direction and pattern that physically points out where food is located.

Honeybee dancing demonstrates displacement, which is generally considered a human characteristic. Most animals will only give a "food-found" call in the physical presence of food, yet bees can talk about food that is over 100 m away.

== Notes and references ==
=== References ===
- Christin, A.-M. L'Image écrite ou la déraison graphique, Paris, Flammarion, coll. « Idées et recherches », 1995
- Ottenhiemer, H. J., Pine, Judith M. S. (2018). The Anthropology of Language. (4 ed., pp. 257–263). Belmont, CA: Wadsworth Cengage Learning.
- Hockett, Charles F. The Problem of Universals in Language in Joseph H. Greenberg (ed.), Universals of Language, Cambridge, MA: The MIT Press, pp. 1–22.
