= A Modern English Grammar on Historical Principles =

Reference grammar of Modern English, first published 1909–1949

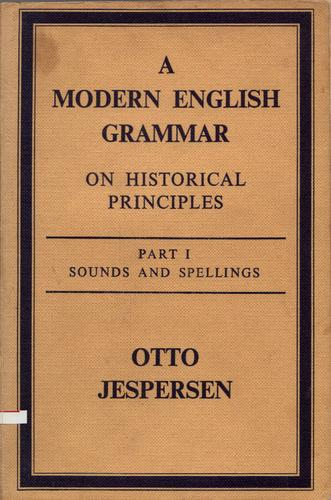
Cover of Part I of Otto Jespersen's A Modern English Grammar on Historical Principles

A Modern English Grammar on Historical Principles (MEG (Note: References within this article to MEG Parts I and VII are to the Allen & Unwin / Munksgaard edition of 1949; those to Parts II and III are to the Allen & Unwin / Munksgaard edition reprinted in 1954 and 1961 respectively; those to Part IV are to the Allen & Unwin edition of 1932; and those to Parts V and VI are to the Munksgaard editions of 1940 and 1942 respectively.)) is a seven-volume reference grammar of Modern English, largely written by Otto Jespersen. The first volume ("part"), Sounds and Spellings, was published in 1909; two through five were on syntax; six was on morphology; and seven returned to the topic of syntax. It took until 1949 for all seven to be completed.

== Aim and scope ==
The appearance of MEG seems to have been expected. The largely unenthusiastic reviewer of Jespersen's Progress in Language wrote in 1895:

I must close this notice with the expression of the hope that Prof. Jespersen will continue his investigations of special points in English grammar and will give us a systematic treatise on the subject. He has adopted the only fruitful way, the collection of historical examples and the deduction of conclusions from them by examination and comparison.

A history of linguistics in the Nordic countries describes MEG in retrospect:

The most outstanding, and without doubt the most influential of the Danish contributions to descriptive grammar was Otto Jespersen's [MEG] (1909–1949). . . . [A]lthough it is certainly not untouched by the neogrammarian education of its author, it is mainly a descriptive study illustrating Jespersen's general ideas of descriptive linguistics. . . .

MEG is "[a] monumental seven-volume grammar of English" that emerged around the same period as did two other multivolume reference grammars of English, both by Dutch scholars: Etsko Kruisinga's A Handbook of Present-Day English (1909–1932), and Hendrik Poutsma's A Grammar of Late Modern English for the Use of Continental, Especially Dutch, Students (1904–1926). In each of these three, the author "used thousands of examples from literary texts to illustrate points of grammar".

Similarly to MEG, Kruisinga's Handbook starts with a volume on phonology and orthography, but, unlike MEG or Poutsma's work, "[has] no historical pretensions". By contrast, MEG – whose author wrote elsewhere that "The distinctive feature of the science of language as conceived nowadays is its historical character" – delivers on its promise of "historical principles".

MEG is unlike the other pair in another way. American English "does not figure in [Poutsma's Grammar] to any significant extent", and is similarly uncommon in Kruisinga's Handbook. By contrast, in MEG, "the total number of comments on [American English] amounts to 224, of which 50 are on phonology (including stress), 9 on spelling, 83 on morphology and syntax, 64 on lexical items, and 18 on word-formation". Those on syntax include a discussion (MEG IV:260–261) on shall versus will in American English.

Jespersen propounded the system underpinning MEG in his book The Philosophy of Grammar (1924). (Note: Jespersen, Otto (1924). The Philosophy of Grammar. London: George Allen & Unwin. OCLC 308037 – via Internet Archive. (Also a 1924 American edition, and later editions.))

== Part by part ==
The work was eventually published in a total of seven of what would normally be termed volumes. But the term part was largely used instead (and volume used additionally for four of those five parts concerned with syntax). (Note: Among the exceptions is the opening of the preface to Part V: "Volume I of this work appeared in 1909, II in 1914, III in 1927 (with an Appendix to vol. II), IV in 1931, and now vol. V appears in 1940.")

=== Part I. Sounds and Spellings ===
This first installment was first published in 1909. (For a more detailed publishing history of this and the other parts, see "Publishing details" below.)

The chapters are:

1. Introduction
2. The basis. Consonants
3. The basis. Vowels and diphthongs
4. The basis. Quantity
5. Stress
6. The earliest changes
7. Early changes in consonant-groups
8. The great vowel-shift
9. Unstressed vowels
10. Loss of consonants and rise of (a·, ɔ·) (Note: In the International Phonetic Alphabet of today, Jespersen's (a·, ɔ·) would instead be [ˈa, ˈɔ].)
11. Seventeenth-century vowel-changes
12. Seventeenth-century consonant changes
13. Eighteenth-century changes
14. Present English sounds. Consonants
15. Present English sounds. Vowels
16. Conclusion

Corrections were made for the 1949 edition. (Note: "Most of these changes originate from Otto Jespersen's own copy of the grammar [sic], but it has not been possible to find space for all" (MEG I:vii).)

=== Part II. Syntax (first volume) ===
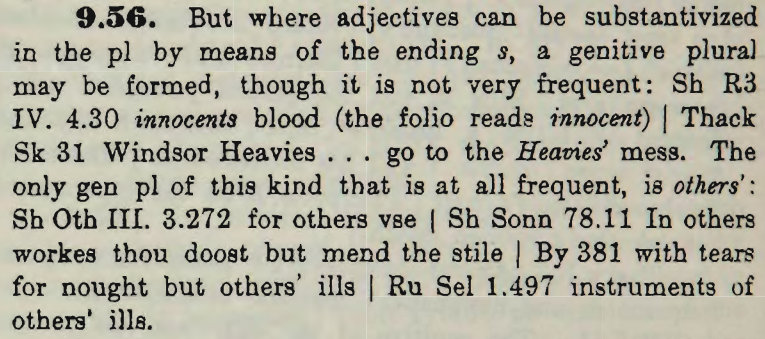
The last of seven sections devoted to the genitive forms of "substantivized adjectives", on page 240 of Part II. Jespersen here cites Shakespeare (Richard III, Othello, Sonnets); Thackeray (Sketches and Travels in London); Byron (Poetical Works, 1905, reproducing The Prisoner of Chillon); and Ruskin (Selections, 1893) – although not always accurately. (Note: Othello has not "for others vse" but "for others vses". "Othello (Folio 1, 1623): Act 3 scene 3" and "Othello (Quarto 1, 1622)", Internet Shakespeare Editions. Jespersen drastically cuts the quotation from Thackeray. If less is cut: "It is good that there should be honest, handsome, hard-living, hard-riding, stupid young Windsor Heavies. . . . And it is good that you should go from time to time to the Heavies' mess, if they ask you; . . ." Sketches and Travels in London (New York: Leypoldt & Holt, 1867), page 96. The Ruskin example (an extract from Modern Painters) reads not "instruments of others' ills" but instead "involuntary instruments they may become of others' good". Selections from the Writings of John Ruskin. First series, 1843–1860. 4th edn. (Orpington: George Allen, 1899, page 497. Jespersen here strays rather beyond "[leaving] out a few unimportant words" (MEG II:vii).)

This was first published in 1914. Although Jespersen might have been expected to proceed from phonology and orthography to syntax via morphology, he postponed morphology, explaining that the prospect of dealing with syntax was more enticing and there was a greater demand among his friends for reading his ideas on syntax.

In his preface, Jespersen describes his system of exemplification and citation, "collected during many years of both systematic and desultory reading" (MEG II:vi); most of this is unremarkable, but:

In quotations from works of fiction I have now and then abbreviated a proper name or replaced it by he or she, just as I have here and there left out a few unimportant words; but I have taken such liberties only with quotations from recent books and where I was quite sure that they could in no wise impair the value of the passage for the purpose for which I used it. (MEG II:vii)

The chapters are:

1. Introductory
2. Number
3. The unchanged plural
4. The meaning of singular and plural
5. Meaning of number. Continued
6. Number in secondary words (Note: Jespersen provides "extremely hot weather" and "a certainly not very cleverly worded remark" as examples; within these, "weather" and "remark" are primary words; "hot" and "worded" are secondary words; "extremely" and "cleverly" are tertiary words (MEG II:2).)
7. Number. Appendix
8. Substantives (Note: By substantive, Jespersen means what today is usually called noun. (He reserves noun for discussion of languages such as Finnish that lack a formal distinction between adjectives and what he calls substantives; MEG II:5).)
9. Substantivized adjectives (Note: The term encompasses substantives (such as "her friend" and "the fiend") that were once adjectives but are so no longer; such items as "the dead", "we mortals" (which now might be regarded as the fused modifier-heads of noun phrases); and "fellow Europeans" and "our elders".)
10. The prop-word (Note: Jespersen attributes the term prop-word to Henry Sweet (MEG II:247).) one (Note: In the book, one is not italicized here. Some other chapter titles italicize words, affixes, etc that are discussed, some other titles do not. For this article, they have all been italicized.)
11. Adjectives as principals (Note: By principal, Jespersen means what he also calls a primary word (MEG II:2).)
12. Relations between adjunct (Note: By adjunct, Jespersen means what he calls a secondary word (MEG II:2). (NB In 21st-century syntax studies, adjunct has a very different meaning.)) and principal
13. Substantives as adjuncts
14. Adjuncts. Continued
15. Adjuncts. Concluded
16. Rank of the pronouns (Note: The rank of a word is its status as principal, adjunct, or subjunct (MEG II:398). Jespersen: "[T]he use of such words as 'govern' and 'rank', in speaking of the relations of words and ideas is only, and can only be, figurative and should not, therefore, be taken too literally" (MEG III:355).)
17. Rank of the pronouns. Concluded

Later editions add an appendix presenting additions and commentary by Jespersen; for the 1949 edition, Niels Haislund added pointers in the main text to this appendix.

=== Part III. Syntax (second volume) ===
First published in 1927. The chapters of a later edition – "Reprinted in Great Britain 1961" and lacking any acknowledgment of revision – are:

1. Various primaries
2. Clauses as primaries
3. Relative clauses as primaries
4. Relative clause adjuncts
5. Relative clauses continued
6. Differentiation of the wh‑pronouns
7. Contact-clauses (Note: By contact-clauses, Jespersen means relative clauses that lack any of what he calls "connectives", i.e. those relative clauses that lack that, who, when, which, where, etc: in his example, "I cannot think so contemptibly of the age I live in" (MEG III:81).)
8. Relative that
9. Relative as, than, but
10. Relative clauses concluded
11. Nexus. (Note: See also the explanation of junction and nexus in MEG III:203–204.) Subject
12. Object
13. Verbs with object or preposition
14. Two objects
15. Subject of a passive verb
16. Transitivity
17. Predicatives (Note: Predicatives are exemplified by "He seemed/was/became anxious", "He seemed/proved/was/became a coward"; quasi-predicatives by "He married young and died poor" (MEG III:356). (Today Jespersen's "predicatives" and "quasi-predicatives" are often called predicative complements [or obligatory predicatives] and optional predicatives respectively.))
18. Predicatives concluded

"(Appendix to Volume III) Predicatives after particles" appeared as the final (23rd) chapter of Part IV.

A detailed review of Part III by Martin B. Ruud starts by saying that a grammarian "must be a realist, a philosopher, an historian, even an antiquarian, and something of an artist as well", and that Jespersen here again demonstrates these qualities. The review then describes particular chapters, or sequences thereof. Of chapter 2, Ruud introduces Jespersen's novel term content clause and describes Jespersen's distinction between X questions and nexus questions (roughly corresponding to what are now more commonly termed open interrogative and polar interrogative clauses respectively). He is glad that Jespersen: "continues to oppose resolutely . . . the use of the term 'dative' in Modern English", commenting: "indeed, where there are no criteria of form how can one speak of something that is either form or nothing at all?" Ruud then considers how the book illuminates lexicological matters, such as the common confusion of intransitive lay and transitive lie – Jespersen does not condemn this (made by authors such as Marvell, Byron and Emily Brontë, it can hardly be called "illiterate"), but instead explains the frequency of its occurrence.

George O. Curme starts his review of Part III:

There is nothing in the domain of philology more stimulating than a new volume by Professor Jespersen. . . . For many years he has been out on the confines of our knowledge fighting to extend its boundaries into the great unknown. The new volume brings us many more valuable contributions.

– whereupon he starts to describe how Jespersen's and his own views on grammar diverge. The pair disagree on the category of here in "leave here" and that of poor in "the poor", on the virtue of replacing the familiar term noun clause with content clause, on whether can, must, shall, etc are verbs, and more. Curme's objection to Jespersen's denial of the existence in Modern English of a dative case is expounded at some length; but simply, the identity of form in "They chose him a wife" to that in "They chose him king" does not deter Curme from saying that the former is an example of the dative. And this is before Curme "turns to what interests him most in Professor Jespersen's new volume – his treatment of relative pronouns".

=== Part IV. Syntax. Third volume. Time and Tense ===
First published in 1931. The chapters are:

1. Introductory
2. Present tense
3. Auxiliaries of the perfect and pluperfect (Note: By perfect, Jespersen means the construction exemplified by "I have written" and "he has written"; by pluperfect, that by "I/he had written" (MEG IV:3))
4. Relations between the present and the perfect
5. Relations between the perfect and the preterit (Note: The preterit is the tense exemplified by was, were, did, stole, took. (Other authors more commonly spell this preterite).))
6. The pluperfect
7. Tenses of the verbids (Note: Jespersen uses verbid for non-finite forms of what other writers term verbs; thus be, being, been, stealing and stolen are verbids (MEG II:7).)
8. Tenses and auxiliaries in the passive
9. Imaginative use of tenses (Note: Jespersen: "Verbal forms which are primarily used to indicate past time are often used without that temporal import to denote unreality, impossibility, improbability or non-fulfilment. In such cases we speak of imaginative tenses or tenses of imagination" (MEG IV:112).)
10. Imaginative tenses continued
11. Indirect speech
12. The expanded tenses (Note: Jespersen means what are exemplified by "am/was writing", "has/have/had been writing", "may/must/will be writing", "can/should/need have been writing" (MEG IV:4, 164). (Other writers call these "progressive" or "continuous" constructions.))
13. Expanded tenses continued
14. Expanded tenses concluded
15. Will
16. Will continued
17. Shall
18. Shall concluded
19. Would
20. Should
21. Will, shall, would, should in indirect speech
22. Notional survey (Note: Whereas for most of MEG Jespersen describes syntactic constructions and the meanings they convey (the semasiological method, normal in reference grammars), here he brings up various notions (such as "Habit") and shows how verbs may be used to express them (the uncommon onomasiological method).)
23. (Appendix to volume III). Predicatives after particles (Note: Particle here means "preposition"; these constructions are exemplified by "he lived there as a physician", "he was regarded as a fool", "He knew for a fact that. . .".)

This part also has a long "Abbreviations and list of books". The great majority of the books listed are works (largely of fiction) that Jespersen credits for examples. Thus for instance an example of past tense dare not is attributed to "Caine M 378" (MEG IV:12): this is page 378 of what "Abbreviations and list of books" explains is Hall Caine's The Manxman (London, 1894) (MEG IV:xii).

Curme's review of Part IV starts by commenting on its treatment of expanded (i.e. progressive) tenses, a treatment that he finds of interest, but inadequate. Unlike Jespersen, Curme uses the term aspect as well as tense; he rejects Jespersen's denial that English has no "real future tense".

=== Part V. Syntax. Fourth volume ===
First published in 1940. The chapters are:

1. Introductory
2. Simple nexus as ordinary object
3. Simple nexus as object of result
4. Various remarks on nexus-objects
5. Simple nexus as regimen (Note: Jespersen: "I now restrict the name of object to its use in a nexus, where it may be the object of a verb, including an infinitive and a participle, as well as of a gerund or a verbal nexus-substantive. Formerly I used the term in conformity with most English grammars also of what is governed by a preposition; this I now prefer calling its regimen" (MEG V:6).) of a preposition
6. A simple nexus as tertiary
7. Nexus-substantives
8. The gerund. Substantival nature (Note: The gerund, functioning as a substantive functions: for example, with an article ("the teaching of a foreign language"). (Other grammarians would call this a gerundial noun.))
9. The gerund. Verbal nature (Note: The gerund, functioning as a verb functions: for example, with an object ("teaching a foreign language"). (Other grammarians would call this a gerund-participle.))
10. The infinitive
11. The infinitive. Subject and predicative
12. Infinitive as object
13. To-infinitive as object
14. Infinitive governed by prepositions (Note: Jespersen: "[T]he use of such words as 'govern' and 'rank', in speaking of the relations of words and ideas is only, and can only be, figurative and should not, therefore, be taken too literally" (MEG III:355).)
15. The infinitive as secondary
16. The infinitive as tertiary
17. Infinitives of reaction and specification (Note: Infinitive of reaction: "here we have a reference to an event which is past, or at any rate contemporaneous, in relation to the time of the main verb" (MEG V:259). Infinitive of specification: "The infinitive often serves to specify or give a supplementary determination to a word which in itself has a somewhat vague signification"; thus "the man to go means 'the man who is to go, should go', etc., while it is time to go = 'the time appropriate for going' " (MEG V:262–263).)
18. Subject + infinitive as object of main verb
19. Subject + infinitive in other employments
20. Final remarks on infinitives
21. Clauses as tertiaries
22. Implied dependent nexus
23. Negation
24. Requests
25. Questions

Also included is "Additions to the list of abbreviations in vol. IV".

The preface thanks the Carlsberg Foundation for its continuing support; the prefaces to Parts VI and VII do the same.

Francis states of nexus, a concept important to Jespersen, that it "is nowhere dealt with within the first three Syntax volumes of MEG". In view of the coverage of nexus in the second volume – remarked on in a review – this must be mistaken. (Note: Francis is also mistaken in saying that nexus made its first appearance in Jespersen's book Essentials of English Grammar (1933): it first appeared in 1913.) But aside from the matter of earlier appearances:

[T]he fourth Syntax volume of MEG . . . is wholly devoted to nexus and contains eleven chapters, nearly 200 pages, on infinitives. This is one of the most complex areas of English grammar, and remains one of Jespersen's most distinguished accomplishments as a grammarian.

In a review of Parts V and VI, Simeon Potter determines that "The dependent nexus is the main theme of Part V: a simple nexus as object; a simple nexus as regimen of a preposition; a simple nexus as tertiary; nexus-substantives; the gerund; the infinitive; clauses; an implied nexus (agent-substantives and participles)." He criticizes the book in places, but his praise includes the observation that:

No one has discussed ellipsis, that cardinal problem for the syntactician, with greater ingenuity than Jespersen. Aposiopesis, prosiopesis, suppression, subaudition, sous entendu, latent phrase and incomplete clause have all been illuminated in their turn.

=== Part VI. Morphology ===
This was first published in 1942.

Jespersen "was content to delegate the major part of the work to [Niels] Haislund and . . . Paul Christophersen and Knud Schibsbye" who had to work with his lecture notes from 1925. Jespersen did carefully examine the result. His preface to Part VI gives more detail, stating which chapter, and often which section of which chapter, was written by which of the four; and, where he himself was one of the writers, then sometimes also when (from 1894 to 1942) he had written it. However:

In consequence of the manuscripts having in some instances passed to and fro between others and myself it would now be difficult for me to decide which particulars are due to me and which to my co-workers. But anyhow the full responsibility for any shortcomings rests with me exclusively. (MEG VI:v)

The circumstances of editorial work on Part VI were not happy:

When writing the first four volumes of my Grammar I was in constant touch with friends in England, most of them competent scholars, whom I was able to consult on knotty points. If it had been possible I should very often have done the same with regard to this volume, but to my great regret the unfortunate happenings to my country during this miserable war have prevented me from asking the advice of native Englishmen. A few pages, however, were revised by the then lecturer in the University of Copenhagen, Mr. A. F. Colburn, before he was forced to leave Denmark. Something is rotten in the state of the world. May Heaven direct it! (MEG VI:vi) (Note: Compare: Mar[cellus]. Something is rotten in the State of Denmarke. Hor[atio]. Heauen will direct it. Shakespeare, William (1623). The Tragedie of Hamlet, Prince of Denmarke. 1.4.678–679. Internet Shakespeare Editions. University of Victoria.)

"This volume naturally falls into five parts", writes Jespersen, describing these (MEG VI:5):

1. "Verbal flexions" (inflectional suffixes to verbs): chapters 2–5.
2. "The naked word" ("i.e. the kernel without any internal change and without the addition of any formative", (Note: Formative is a general term, covering prefixes, suffixes, other morphs, and even such oddities as the ‑od‑ within spasmodic.) MEG VI:83): chapters 6–12.
3. "Endings" (suffixation and more), chapters 13–25.
4. "Prefixes": chapters 26–28.
5. "Shortenings" (subtractions, clippings): chapter 29.

The chapters are:

1. Introduction
2. Personal endings in verbs
3. Personal endings in verbs. Continued
4. Tense-formation in the verbs
5. Tense-formation in the verbs. Continued
6. The naked word
7. The naked word. Continued
8. Compounds
9. Compounds. Concluded
10. Reduplicative compounds
11. Change of vowel without any addition of formative
12. Change of consonant without any addition of formative (Note: The relationships between such pairs as grass/graze and device/devise.)
13. Vocalic endings (Note: Endings with a vowel.)
14. The ordinary ‑er‑ending
15. Other endings containing r
16. The ordinary s‑ending (Note: About genitive s.)
17. Group formations, with s‑ending
18. The endings ‑s and ‑st in particles (Note: "Particles here include Adverbs, Prepositions and Conjunctions" (MEG VI:303).)
19. Other endings with sibilants
20. The ending ‑n (‑en) (Note: Exemplified by oxen, mine, woollen, taken, sharpen, heighten (MEG VI:337–338).)
21. Other suffixes containing nasals
22. L-suffixes (Note: Suffixes ending /l/.)
23. L-suffixes continued (Note: Other suffixes including /l/ (such as ‑like).)
24. Suffixes containing dentals
25. Final batch of suffixes
26. Negative and related prefixes
27. Prepositional prefixes (Note: "[P]refixes that owe their origin to prepositions" (MEG VI:489).)
28. Prefixes concluded
29. Shortenings

In the context of the "naked word" – as seen in "My back hurts", "He's back", "I posted it back", "You should back out" – Jespersen claims that:

The development of such identical forms must be reckoned one of the chief merits of the language, for this "noiseless" machinery facilitates the acquirement and use of the language enormously and outweighs many times the extremely few instances in practical life in which ambiguity can arise. . . . Anyhow it is ridiculous to say, as is sometimes done, that English no longer distinguishes between the parts of speech, between noun and [verb], etc. (MEG VI:85)

While conceding that Part VI and Herbert Koziol's Handbuch der englischen Wortbildungslehre (1937) "admirably supplement each other and both are equally welcome", Simeon Potter finds that the former "contains numerous errors and perpetuates many incomplete statements of historical fact". He provides a great number of these and says that constraints on space preclude the provision of more.

Francis rates this "the most traditional and least original part" of MEG. "Though there are a few excellent chapters", writes Hans Marchand of this part, "the book is not one of the best Jespersen has written."

=== Part VII. Syntax ===
Published (posthumously) in 1949. The title page does not indicate that this is the fifth of five volumes about syntax.

Part VII was completed and edited by Niels Haislund, who describes in its preface how chapters 1–5 were written by Jespersen, and chapters 6–18 by Jespersen, Haislund, and Paul Christophersen (MEG VII:iii–v). The main text of the book frequently refers to Jespersen in the third person.

The chapters are:

1. Word-classes
2. Sentence-structure and word-order
3. Sentence-structure. Concluded
4. Person
5. Sex and gender
6. Case
7. Case in pronouns (continued)
8. Case in nouns (Note: Nouns here include not only what today are termed nouns (and which Jespersen terms substantives), but also adjectives.)
9. Case (continued)
10. Comparison
11. Comparison (continued)
12. Determination and indetermination (the articles)
13. Articles before junctions
14. Stage two. The definite article (Note: The three "stages of familiarity" – I, "Complete unfamiliarity (or ignorance)" (which may require an indefinite article); II, "Nearly complete familiarity. The word in question still requires the"; III, "Familiarity so complete that no article (determinative) is needed" – are introduced within the chapter "Determination and indetermination" (MEG VII:417–418).)
15. Stage three. Zero
16. Proper names
17. Quantifiers
18. Mood (Note: Indicative, subjunctive, and imperative.)

Also included is "Technical terms (mainly syntactical)", an index not only to MEG as a seven-part whole but also to ten other books by Jespersen and one paper by him.

The explanation via "stages of familiarity" of article use is indebted to Paul Christophersen.

Francis comments on Part VII that "It is not so easy to understand its relationship to the rest of the work", and that much of it revisits matters discussed in the previous four parts devoted to syntax.

== Reception of the whole ==
A review by "A. G. K." of the first three parts of MEG, together with Poutsma's A Grammar of Late Modern English and Kruisinga's A Handbook of Present-Day English, describes MEG as having been "carried near to completion" (which in reality was still four parts and 21 years into the future). "[Somebody desiring] some larger work in which he may find systematically arranged all the more minute distinctions of grammar and usage, each one abundantly illustrated by examples chosen from the best English usage of the present and the past" would, A. G. K. writes, find it in any of the three works. "[T]he proportion of discussion to illustrative matter seems somewhat greater [in Jespersen's] than in Poutsma's grammar", says A. G. K., who adds that all three works are likely to present terminological obstacles for the reader. He suggests that these are likely to be the greatest in MEG, although such innovations "should be merely a challenge to the interested student of English to view his subject from different points of view". A. G. K. concludes that no attempt to choose one work in preference to the other pair is needed, as "The three should stand together on the shelf in any well-equipped library where the student of English could go to them frequently."

H. A. Gleason sees MEG, together with Kruisinga's Handbook and Poutsma's Grammar, as the culmination of a "European scholarly tradition" of grammars mostly written by academics in Germany and the Netherlands and primarily aimed at Anglicists and other specialist readers. Yet MEG, he points out, differs from the works by Kruisinga and Poutsma – and from R. W. Zandvoort's much more compact Handbook of English Grammar (1945) – as its author "is the one great traditional grammarian who gave attention to the general framework of grammar and made considerable innovations. He based his treatment of syntax almost completely on meaning, with rather odd results at many places" – a treatment, Gleason adds, that "can be most conveniently seen in [Jespersen's] one-volume Essentials of English Grammar".

Writing when only Parts I to VI were yet published, Simeon Potter called the work an "imposing achievement", but:

[a work whose] parts may seem to hold together too loosely, lacking preconceived plan. Even the most assiduous reader may fail to gain from them any clear picture of the English language as a whole but this he will surely find elsewhere. (Note: "[Such a picture] and much more", Potter continued, "he will find in those more concise presentations by the master, The Growth and Structure of the English Language and The Essentials of English Grammar, which enjoy an ever widening popularity.")

W. Nelson Francis regrets that "there is no overall index to the whole", and thus that looking for a particular issue is difficult; yet despite this:

MEG remains a master-work. . . . Its great virtues, in addition to the profusion of illustrative citations, are originality and perceptiveness of approach and modesty and clarity of style. Few grammar books make such good reading.

In 1989 Randolph Quirk (primary author of the 1985 book A Comprehensive Grammar of the English Language) said of MEG: "With its wide range of data from literature of all periods and the illuminating explanatory comment, simultaneously along diachronic and synchronic dimensions, this book is a continual source of inspiration and value." Writing in The Cambridge Grammar of the English Language (2002), Rodney Huddleston and Geoffrey K. Pullum called MEG "One of the most complete grammars for English in the first half of the twentieth century", one that "every serious English grammarian consults on a regular basis". (Note: The grammarian Bas Aarts illustrates this with the photograph he uses atop each page of his blog Grammarianism: it shows the spines of five books about English grammar, of which the oldest by over thirty years is MEG Part VII. Aarts, Bas. "Grammarianism". Grammarianism. Wordpress.)

MEG was described when new as "an inexhaustible mine of information . . . illustrated with a wealth of quotations that shows an extraordinary catholicity of taste in [Jespersen's] reading matter". Margaret Thomas shows that it has a wider range of sources than does either Lindley Murray's English Grammar (1795/1808) or Sweet's A New English Grammar, Logical and Historical (1891/1898), and emphasizes sources that were new at the time, thanks to Jespersen's method of amassing examples, a method he had learnt from the editors of A New English Dictionary on Historical Principles (later retitled The Oxford English Dictionary on Historical Principles). MEG also depends less on sentences especially created in order to illustrate it than does either Murray's or Sweet's grammar, or indeed Randolph Quirk et al's A Comprehensive Grammar of the English Language (1985).

Furthermore, Jespersen's coverage in MEG of double negation (Thomas's area of special interest in her comparison) is far better thought out than are those of Murray and Sweet: with examples ordered first semantically (weakened affirmation versus possibly intensified negation), and then by syntactic type. Some examples are from spoken English, and Jespersen also mentions dialectal variations.

MEG has continued to be mined for the great amount of data that Jespersen presents within it. (Note: As examples of books that cite these data: Zandvoort, R. W. (1975). A Handbook of English Grammar (7th ed.). London: Longman. ISBN 0-582-55339-3. Warner, Anthony R. (1993). English Auxiliaries: Structure and History. Cambridge Studies in Linguistics. Cambridge: Cambridge University Press. ISBN 0-521-30284-6. Dixon, R. M. W. (2005). A Semantic Approach to English Grammar. Oxford Textbooks in Linguistics (2nd ed.). Oxford: Oxford University Press. ISBN 978-0-19-928307-1. (Also ISBN 978-0-19-924740-0.))

However, following MEG beyond its copious data to their interpretation can be problematic. Even aside from his more conspicuous theoretical concepts (nexus, junction, rank), which although thought-provoking have seldom been adopted, a number of Jespersen's dicta can surprise. As an example, he writes:

Most grammarians recognize the infinitive as object in cases like "I want to sing" and "I promise to sing"; cf. "I want this" and "I promise nothing". The only grammarian, as far as I know, who has ever objected to this view is Harold E. Palmer. . . . It will seem more strange that I recognize the bare infinitive as object after such verbs as can and will. (MEG V:169)

It now seems that Harold E. Palmer was ahead of his time. (Note: To sing within "I want to sing" and swim within "I can swim" (and indeed also jogging within "I tried jogging" and swum within "I have swum") are standardly understood not as objects but as catenative complements of want, can, etc. "[W]e take non-finite clauses to be objects, rather than catenative complements, only when they occur in some distinctively object relation with some element other than the head verb" (as in "This made obtaining a loan virtually impossible", and "We've been giving moving to Sydney a good deal of thought recently").) And as for what Jespersen concedes is "more strange", Frank R. Palmer points out that he makes the claim despite the ungrammaticality of *can cricket; Palmer comments that "There is no virtue in this line of argument."

As for the lasting impact of MEG, descriptions differ. Margaret Thomas writes of the work: "[Jespersen's] felicitous powers of observation, broad-mindedness, originality, and erudition – all communicated in an easy and artless prose style – attract admiring readers to this day." Geoffrey K. Pullum describes MEG as "magnificent but mostly ignored".

== Publishing details ==
For the editions listed below, George Allen & Unwin published in London, Ejnar Munksgaard in Copenhagen, Routledge in Abingdon (Oxfordshire), and Carl Winter in Heidelberg.

- Part I. Sounds and Spellings. Carl Winter, 1909. OCLC 895492988. Carl Winter, 1927. OCLC 832266245. Ejnar Munksgaard; George Allen & Unwin, 1949. OCLC 800238088. Routledge, 2006. ISBN 978-0-415-40249-1. Routledge, 2013. ISBN 978-0-415-86022-2.
- Part II. Syntax (first volume). Carl Winter, 1914. OCLC 721272956. Carl Winter, 1927. OCLC 504564992. Ejnar Munksgaard; George Allen & Unwin, 1949. OCLC 605981203. Routledge, 2006. ISBN 978-0-415-40250-7. Routledge, 2014. ISBN 978-0-415-86023-9.
- Part III. Syntax (second volume). Carl Winter, 1927. OCLC 163081744. George Allen & Unwin, 1928. OCLC 605978794. Ejnar Munksgaard; George Allen & Unwin, 1949. OCLC 493040485. Routledge, 2006. ISBN 978-0-415-40251-4. Routledge, 2013. ISBN 978-0-415-86462-6.
- Part IV. Syntax. Third volume. Time and Tense. Carl Winter, 1931. OCLC 1072433169. George Allen & Unwin, 1932. Ejnar Munksgaard; George Allen & Unwin, 1949. OCLC 751237223. Routledge, 2006. ISBN 978-0-415-40252-1. Routledge, 2013. ISBN 978-0-415-86024-6.
- Part V. Syntax. Fourth volume. Ejnar Munksgaard, 1940. OCLC 175015576. George Allen & Unwin, 1946. Routledge, 2007. ISBN 978-0-415-40253-8. Routledge, 2013. ISBN 978-0-415-86025-3.
- Part VI. Morphology. Ejnar Munksgaard, 1942. OCLC 220329786. George Allen & Unwin, 1946. Routledge, 2006. ISBN 978-0-415-40254-5. Routledge, 2013. ISBN 978-0-415-86463-3.
- Part VII. Syntax. Ejnar Munksgaard; George Allen & Unwin, 1949. OCLC 889073122. Routledge, 2006. ISBN 978-0-415-40255-2. Routledge, 2013. ISBN 978-0-415-86026-0.

== Works cited ==
- A. G. K. (April 1928). "A Grammar of Late Modern English for the Use of Continental, Especially Dutch, Students. By H[endrik] Poutsma. A Modern English Grammar on Historical Principles, parts I–III. By Otto Jespersen. A Handbook of Present-Day English (4th edition). By E[tsko] Kruisinga". American Speech (Review). 3 (4): 334–339. JSTOR 451279.
- Curme, George O. (June 1928). "A Modern English Grammar on Historical Principles. Part III. Syntax. Second volume. By Otto Jespersen". Language (Review). 4 (2): 135–148. doi:10.2307/408800. JSTOR 408800.
- Curme, George O. (October 1932). "A Modern English Grammar on Historical Principles. Part IV. Syntax. Third volume. Time and tense. By Otto Jespersen". The Journal of English and Germanic Philology (Review). 31 (4): 586–590. JSTOR 27703696.
- Hovdhaugen, Even; Karlsson, Fred; Henriksen, Carol; Sigurd, Bengt (2000). The History of Linguistics in the Nordic Countries. Helsinki: Societas Scientiarum Fennica. ISBN 951-653-305-1. (Also preprint, via Fred Karlsson and Internet Archive.)
- Huddleston, Rodney; Pullum, Geoffrey K. (2002). The Cambridge Grammar of the English Language. Cambridge: Cambridge University Press. ISBN 978-0-521-43146-0.
- Juul, Arne; Nielsen, Hans F., eds. (1989). Otto Jespersen: Facets of His Life and Work. Amsterdam Studies in the Theory and History of Linguistic Science 52. Amsterdam: John Benjamins. ISBN 9789027278357 – via Internet Archive.
  - Francis, W. Nelson. "Otto Jespersen as grammarian". In Juul & Nielsen (1989), pp. 79–99.
  - Quirk, Randolph. Preface. In Juul & Nielsen (1989), pp. vii–ix.
- Leitner, Gerhard, ed. (1991). English Traditional Grammars: An International Perspective. Studies in the History of the Language Sciences. Amsterdam: John Benjamins. ISBN 90-272-4549-5.
  - Lyons, Christopher G. "Reference and articles". In Leitner (1991), pp. 309–328.
  - Ramisch, Heinrich. "The rôle of American English in traditional grammars of English". In Leitner (1991), pp. 369–380.
  - van Essen, Arthur. "E. Kruisinga". In Leitner (1991), pp. 153–174.
- Potter, Simeon (July 1947). "A Modern English Grammar on Historical Principles. Part V: Syntax, Fourth volume. Part VI: Morphology. By Otto Jespersen. . . ". The Modern Language Review (Review). 42 (3): 367–370. doi:10.2307/3717308. JSTOR 3717308.
- Ruud, Martin B. (October 1929). "A Modern English Grammar on Historical Principles. Part III. Syntax. Second volume. By Otto Jespersen". The Journal of English and Germanic Philology (Review). 28 (4): 532–539. JSTOR 27703304.
- Thomas, Margaret (2019). "Conceptualizations of grammar in the history of English grammaticology". In Aarts, Bas; Bowie, Jill; Popova, Gergana (eds.). The Oxford Handbook of English Grammar. Oxford: Oxford University Press. pp. 2–20. doi:10.1093/oxfordhb/9780198755104.013.33. ISBN 9780198755104. (Also ISBN 9780191816499.)
