= Otto Jespersen =

Danish linguist (1860–1943)

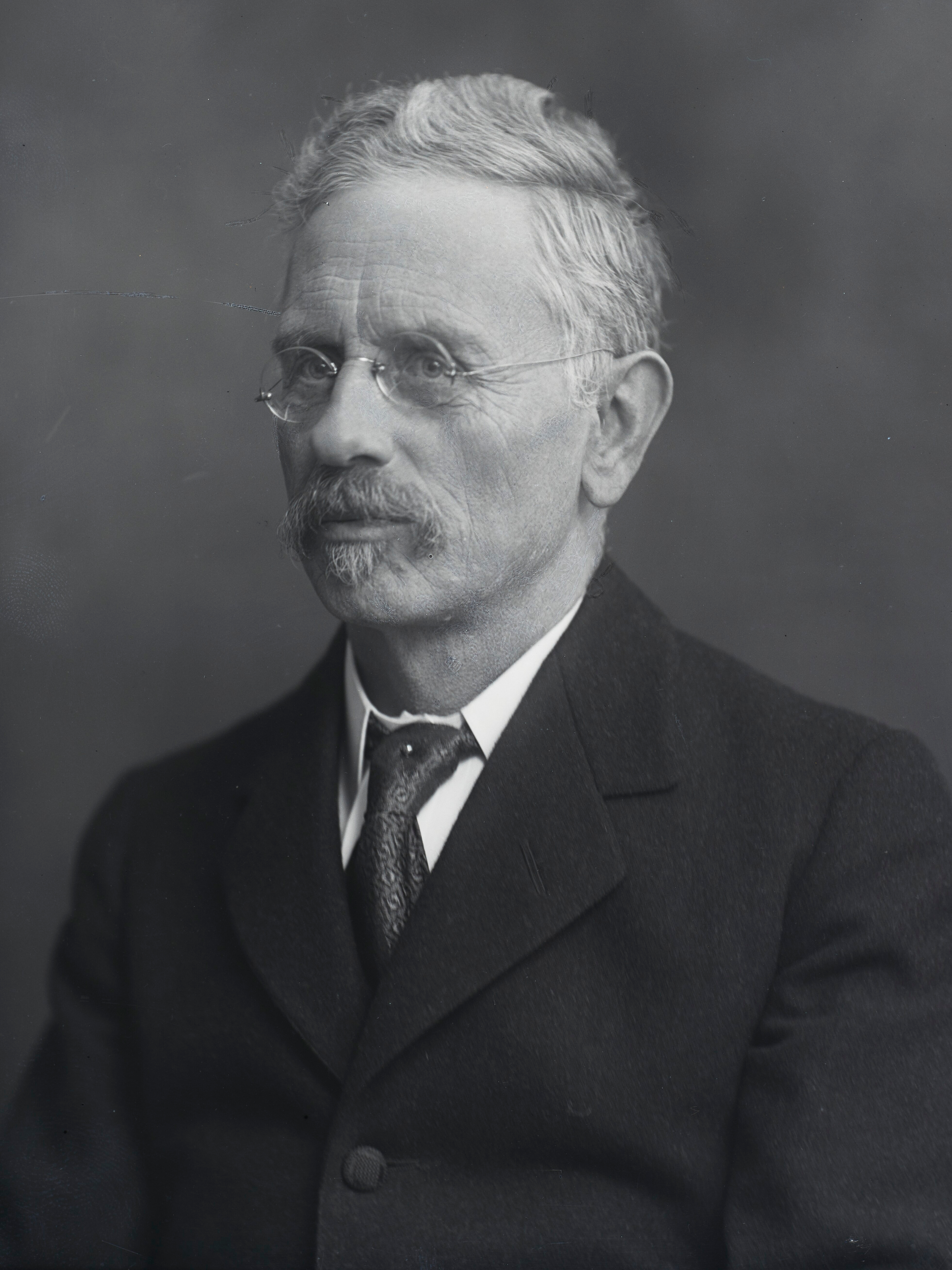
- Jespersen c. 1919–1921
- Born: 16 July 1860; Randers, Denmark
- Died: 30 April 1943 (aged 82); Roskilde, Denmark
- Occupation: Linguist

Jens Otto Harry Jespersen (Danish: [ˈʌtˢo ˈjespɐsn̩]; 16 July 1860 – 30 April 1943) was a Danish linguist who worked in foreign-language pedagogy, historical phonetics, and other areas, but is best known for his description of the grammar of the English language. Steven Mithen describes him as "one of the greatest language scholars of the nineteenth and twentieth centuries."

== Early life ==
Otto Jespersen was born in Randers in Jutland, to Jens Bloch Jespersen (1813–1870) and Sophie Caroline Bentzien (1833–1874). He was one of nine children. After his father died the family moved to Hillerød, where his Jutland accent was ridiculed.

As a boy, Jespersen was inspired by works of the Danish philologist Rasmus Rask and the biography of Rask by Niels Matthias Petersen; and with the help of Rask's grammars taught himself some Icelandic, Italian, and Spanish.

== Academic life and work ==
Jespersen's father, grandfather and great-grandfather had been lawyers, and the same was expected of him. He entered the University of Copenhagen in 1877 when he was 17, initially studying law but not abandoning his language studies. In his first year at university, he attended a lecture course by Sophus Heegaard on the history of Evolutionism since the Greeks; this introduced him to the ideas of Herbert Spencer, and later in life he looked back on the course warmly. Teaching languages in a lower secondary school and working from 1880 to 1887 as a stenographer for the Rigsdag (Danish parliament) brought an income that in 1881 allowed Jespersen to shift his focus completely to languages. Following the introduction of a new degree, Skoleembedseksamen, he switched to this, choosing French as the major subject and English as the second minor subject, the first compulsorily being Latin (a language that he hated from then on). He was one of a large number of students who appealed for Latin to be made voluntary, but the appeal was unsuccessful. Thanks to his need for an income, obtaining a Master's degree (in French) took Jespersen a decade, but the delays may well have determined his "habits of wide and self-motivated study".

Jespersen studied under the linguists Karl Verner, Hermann Möller and particularly Vilhelm Thomsen; and beyond linguistics, under Harald Høffding. It was thanks to Høffding that Jespersen was further exposed to the writings and ideas of Darwin, Mill and Spencer, and to introspective psychology.

In 1887 Jespersen passed Skoleembedseksamen. For French, he chose to be examined on Diderot, from a lasting enthusiasm for the ideals of the French Revolution and the Enlightenment. Throughout his life Jespersen remained faithful to the ideals and methods of his early teachers. Positivist and evolutionary attitudes, physiological and psychological methods in their classical form, and finally, liberal humanism were essential to his character.

Jespersen's views on language owed less to theoretical considerations than to a practical and thus largely functional conception of language; as a language theorist, Jespersen could remain tethered to reality thanks to the common sense fundamental to his character. Even when making such bold proposals as that of the "progress" of a language, he could avoid extremes.

In 1887, soon after passing the Skoleembedseksamen, Jespersen went to London, where he met the phoneticians Wilhelm Viëtor, Alexander Ellis and Henry Sweet. In October he went on to Oxford, where James Murray told him of progress towards A New English Dictionary, and where he heard lectures by the Assyriologist Archibald Sayce and others.

Around New Year 1888 he went to Germany, first visiting Leipzig, where he met the phonetician Friedrich Techmer and the historical linguists Karl Brugmann and August Leskien. He also visited the historical linguist Eduard Sievers, the phonetician Franz Beyer and the English teacher Hermann Klinghardt (Note: On Klinghardt, see Siefert, Thomas Raymond (2013). Translation in Foreign Language Pedagogy: The Rise and Fall of the Grammar Translation Method (PhD thesis). Harvard University. pp. 155–156.), at Halle, Weißenfels and Reichenbach respectively. He then stayed with Paul Passy at Neuilly-sur-Seine for two months, each day going with him to Paris to see the sights, to hear lectures by the Romance scholar Gaston Paris, the Orientalist James Darmesteter or the dialectologist Jules Gilliéron, or to audit Passy's English lessons.

He then went to Berlin to study Old and Middle English in Berlin under the philologist Julius Zupitza. Among his fellow students were the Anglicists Josef Schick and G. C. Moore Smith, both of whom would long remain friends.

Following a tip from his mentor Vilhelm Thomsen that after a few years there would be a vacancy for a specialist in English, he returned to Copenhagen in August 1888 and began work on his doctoral dissertation on the English case system, a dissertation that he successfully defended in 1891. His doctorate entitled Jespersen to teach in the university without pay as a Privatdocent; he took this opportunity to teach classes on Chaucer and Old English, thereby adding to his qualifications for the expected vacancy; he also wrote a book on Chaucer.

On the resignation of George Stephens as Docent, the newly vacant position was upgraded to that of Professorship of English language and literature. Jespersen was one of four applicants; the others were Adolf Hansen and Jón Stefánsson (both regarded as rather lacklustre), and William Craigie (then very young). This was "a no-holds-barred contest", during which Jón Stefánsson even published a book charging Jespersen with plagiarizing Georg von der Gabelentz (a charge that Gabelentz himself denied). Up to date in English philology, familiar with English literature, and "[speaking] English perfectly", Jespersen was chosen.

Jespersen was a professor of English at the University of Copenhagen from 1893 to his retirement in 1925. This was not such a comfortable position: in 1911 he published an article in the newspaper Politiken describing poor conditions for academic work (serious underfunding, and the lack of a compulsory retirement age for professors), and also how he had got his wife to promise to shoot him if he failed to retire at 65. He remained something of a radical, in a magazine article published in 1914 he made further recommendations: that Denmark should have more than one university (its second would only arrive in 1928), that a Faculty of Divinity did not belong in a modern university, that there should be financial incentives for students to proceed to postgraduate work, and more. However, although Jespersen succeeded in having Latin removed as a compulsory minor, it can be inferred (Note: "[I]t seems easy to see Jespersen's hand" in the new status of Chaucer; this was "the Jespersen who created three sacred cows (Chaucer, Spenser and Milton) to join Shakespeare".) that he backed the compulsory inclusion of Chaucer, Spenser and Milton in the English course.

Jespersen was Dean of the Faculty of Arts from November 1904 to November 1906; and Rector (vice-chancellor, or president) of the university from November 1920 to November 1921. Among his engagements while Rector was an address at the inauguration in March 1921 of the Institute of Theoretical Physics (later renamed Niels Bohr Institute). Another was a speech (Note: Reprinted in Jespersen, Otto (1932). Tanker og Studier [Thoughts and studies] (in Danish). Copenhagen: Gyldendalske Boghandel. pp. 18–26. OCLC 1508095448.) welcoming new students in September 1921: "he exhorts [them] to absorb the scholarly and scientific tradition (to the extent of being critical of their professors!), the only genuine hallmark of academics".

Jespersen was the third President of the Modern Humanities Research Association, for the years 1920–21. His presidential address, delivered in 1921, was titled 'Our Title and its Import'.

=== Language teaching ===
At the end of the 19th century the teaching in Denmark of contemporaneous foreign languages was ossified, and very similar to that of long-dead classical languages. This was despite the belief of N. M. Petersen, expressed decades earlier, that pupils should be encouraged to acquire a second language in the way that they had acquired their first, and indeed despite the writings of Jan Amos Comenius in the 17th century.

In 1886, Jespersen, August Western and Johan August Lundell cofounded a Scandinavian group for a revitalization of language teaching, naming the group "Quousque Tandem" after Wilhelm Viëtor's pseudonym as author of the 1882 pamphlet Der Sprachunterricht muss umkehren!. (Note: Der Sprachunterricht muss umkehren! Ein Beitrag zur Überbürdungsfrage ('Language teaching must start afresh! A contribution to the question of stress and overwork in school'). The second edition (1886) – whose title page incidentally identifies "Quousque Tandem" as "Wilhelm Vietor" (without diaeresis) – is here at the Internet Archive.) The group opposed the use of theoretical grammar and translation exercises, advocating in its place the teaching of a language in its spoken and living form by the "direct" method, informed by phonetics:

The pupils should begin by recognizing words and short sentences by ear, and repeating them, and only then should they learn to read them. A correct pronunciation should be secured with the help of phonetic transcription.

As a campaigner, Jespersen was an extremist: Hjelmslev writes that this was an area where his normal moderation and common sense were counterbalanced by a revolutionary fervour, and that he was a "Jacobin" among linguists.

Jespersen's first book (1884) was a Danish translation, Praktisk Tilegnelse af Fremmede Sprog ("Practical acquisition of foreign languages"), of Die praktische Spracherlernung, by Felix Franke. Both Franke (also born in 1860) and Jespersen first assumed that the other was much older than himself, but from its start in 1884 their correspondence quickly became a lively discussion (about two hundred letters and postcards survive) of such matters as second language education and phonetic scripts; it was cut short in 1886 when Franke succumbed to tuberculosis. (Note: For a short biography of Franke, see Hausmann, Frank-Rutger (2022). Hurch, Bernhard (ed.). "Felix Franke". Hugo Schuchardt Archiv (in German). University of Graz. hdl:11471/518.10.2.1512.)

In an article published in 1886 (and elaborated in his 1901 book Sprogundervisning, translated as How to Teach a Foreign Language, 1904), Jespersen argued for the following principles in language teaching:

1. Teaching should be based on spoken rather than written language. To this end, at early stages of language teaching, only a phonetic script should be used, and this script should be clear and precise.
2. Material for reading should not consist of unrelated sentences. It should instead constitute coherent texts, preferably designed so that the meanings of unfamiliar words can be inferred from their contexts.
3. At early stages the teaching of grammar should be minimized, and the pupils encouraged to infer grammatical patterns for themselves. Grammar may be examined and practised later, but time should not be spent on grammatical curios, and form and function should not be separated.
4. Exercises in translating the second language into the first should not be emphasized; exercises in translating the first into the second are of very little utility.

Jespersen followed his 1884 translation of Franke with Kortfattet engelsk Grammatik for Tale- og Skriftsproget (1885), Fransk Læsebog efter Lydskriftsmetoden (1889), and (with Christian Sarauw) Engelsk Begynderbog (1895), whose use of phonetic script and nursery rhymes made it most unusual. After a heated contest, these books, together with books written by others that similarly used the "direct method", soon took over from the "grammar–translation" material against which Jespersen and Quousque Tandem had rebelled, as recognized by the Secondary Schools Act of 1903.

=== Phonetics ===
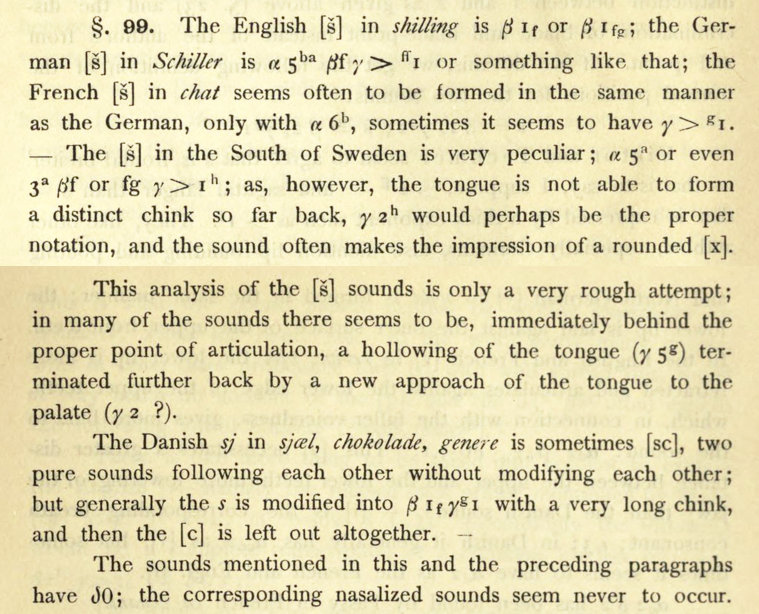
Jespersen's "analphabetic" representation (1889) of phones elsewhere transcribed as [š]

Jespersen's interest in phonetics was prompted by Henry Sweet's Handbook of Phonetics (1877), and the lectures of Vilhelm Thomsen. In the 1880s, inspired by Melville Bell and other British phoneticians, Jespersen developed what he first called an "analphabetic" system (Note: Published in The Articulations of Speech Sounds Represented by Means of Analphabetic Symbols (Marburg: N.G. Elwert, 1889).) – which, in order "to avoid ridicule", he later termed an "antalphabetic" system – that used a series of three variables for any phone: lowercase Roman for the passive articulator, lowercase Greek for the active articulator, and numerals and more for "the degree and shape of the aperture at a place of constriction". Jørgen Rischel points out that a given "anatomical feature" can be labelled according to its use: thus rather than simply "uvular", the role of the uvula can be described as "a passive articulator in uvular consonants but an active articulator in nasalized sounds".

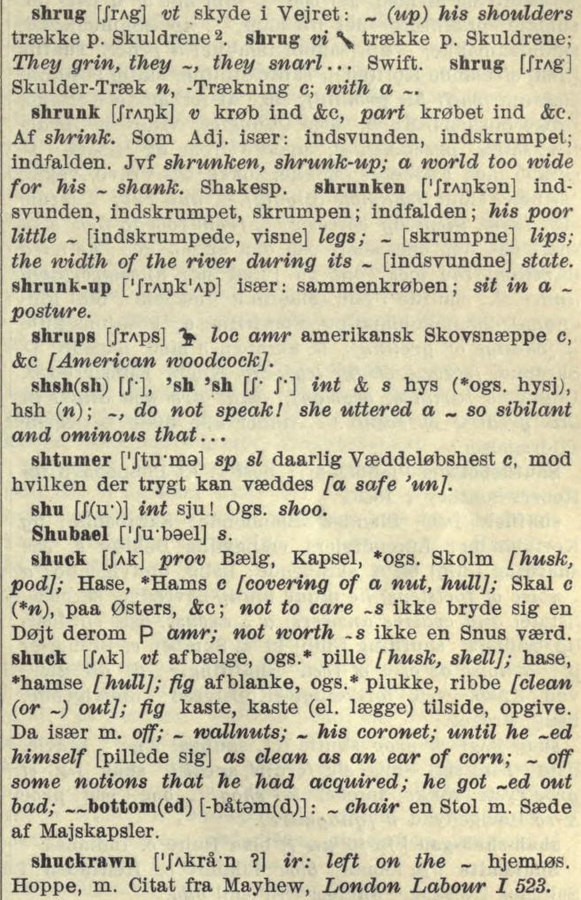
John Brynildsen, A Dictionary of the English and Dano-Norwegian Languages (vol. 2, 1907); with phonetic script by Jespersen

In June 1886, he became a member of the Phonetic Teachers' Association, later renamed the International Phonetic Association (IPA). The idea of creating a phonetic alphabet that could be used by every language was first put forward by Jespersen in a letter he sent to Paul Passy. Jespersen's transcription system for English, used in John Brynildsen's A Dictionary of the English and Dano-Norwegian Languages (1902–1907), (Note: J(ohn) Brynildsen, Engelsk–Dansk–Norsk Ordbog = A Dictionary of the English and Dano-Norwegian Languages (Copenhagen: Gyldendalske–Nordiske, 1902 [vol. 1], 1907 [vol. 2]). The author is named as "John Brynildsen" and "J. Brynildsen" on the English and the Dano-Norwegian title page respectively. Also on the title page: "Danisms supervised by Johannes Magnussen. English pronunciation by Otto Jespersen.") is very close to that of Daniel Jones, which it preceded by some years. Language-specific systems were not unusual at the time (Johan A. Lundell published a Swedish dialect alphabet in 1879, Johan Storm devised Norvegia for Norwegian in 1884); and Jespersen devised a system, Dania, for the phonetic transcription of Danish (1890), which has remained in use for philological, dialectological and lexicographic work in Danish. Jespersen was sceptical of a single phonetic transcription system for universal application, and did not use the IPA's International Phonetic Alphabet.

With continued encouragement by Thomsen and a new friendship with Paul Passy, whom he met in Paris, Jespersen was well informed on phonetics. His own major work on this was Fonetik, published in 1897–1899. In it, Jespersen bases his descriptions on his observations of his own production of sounds in a variety of languages, where this production satisfies native speakers. Jespersen was keen to supplant metaphorical and impressionistic terms with those that described the vocal tract, and had considerable success. Jørgen Rischel calls Fonetik "a landmark in Danish phonetics because of its terminology", much of which has lasted.

The Danish-specific material within Fonetik was republished in 1906 within the booklet Modersmålets Fonetik ("Phonetics of the mother tongue"). This treated not only the sounds of Danish but also its prosody, an area in which Jespersen was a pioneer. Repeatedly reprinted, the booklet was long used as a standard textbook.

Two books, Phonetische Grundfragen ("Phonetics essentials") and Lehrbuch der Phonetik ("Textbook of phonetics"), presented portions of Fonetik – stripped of content specific to Danish, but updated – to readers of German in 1904. Jespersen hoped for an English translation, and plans were made first for a translation by Hans Jørgen Uldall and later for a revision by him; however, no English translation ever appeared.

Rischel writes that: "It is Jespersen's amazing breadth in [his studies of phonetics], paired with his never failing linguistic intuition as a safeguard against errors or downright nonsense, which impresses the reader today." In Eli Fischer-Jørgensen's estimate (1979), Jespersen was not a great innovator, but was unusually adept at pronunciation and the description of articulatory phonetics, and also aware of the importance of contrast.

[Jespersen's] theory of the syllable is an original contribution for which he has not always been given sufficient recognition. Here he maintains that speech sounds have an inherent force called sonority, that sounds can be ranked according to sonority, and that syllables correlate with peaks of sonority. . . . [H]e emphasized the ability of sounds to distinguish meanings. In this respect Jespersen can be considered a forerunner of phonemic theory.

Although not a phonologist himself, Jespersen was the first to propose a conceptual distinction between phonetics and phonology that is commonly observed today. (Note: "It would, perhaps, be advisable to restrict the word 'phonetics' to universal or general phonetics and to use the word phonology of the phenomena peculiar to a particular language (e.g. 'English Phonology'). . . ." However, Jespersen's suggestion continues: "this question of terminology is not very important".)

Early dialectological and other fieldwork on East Slesvig and North Jutland dialects, Faroese, and West Greenlandic work was indebted to Jespersen's methodology (although for the last, the researcher William Thalbitzer "did not live up to Jespersen's standards at all").

Stød, "a particular kind of laryngealisation (creaky voice) characterizing some Danish syllables", had been studied since the mid-18th century (by Jens Høysgaard), but Jespersen's synchronic study of stød and of its morphology and also his study of the relationship between the Danish stød and "the Norwegian and Swedish tonal ('musical') accents" were major advances from the work done by Rasmus Rask, Karl Verner, and Henry Sweet.

Hans Basbøll evaluates Jespersen as "a true pioneer in his analysis of stress" saying that:

he developed a whole system of types of stress and described it in detail: both syntactic principles of stress reduction (unitary stress, or unit accentuation), of compound stress, of value stress (different types of emphatic stress), and so on.

Jespersen's early work focused primarily on language teaching reform and on phonetics, but he would soon branch out:

There was hardly any field of linguistics that Jespersen did not touch upon or develop. He was a diachronic linguist, an excellent phonetician, an equally good descriptive syntactician, both in theory and practice, and one of the founders of sociolinguistics, although he never referred to it as such.

=== Concentration on English ===
While still regarding himself as less of a scholar of English than a scholar of French, Jespersen published Kortfattet engelsk Grammatik for Tale- og Skriftsproget ("A concise English grammar for the spoken and written language") in 1885. Most unusually for a grammar book, this employed phonetic script. Inge Kabell comments: "All other grammars of English published in Denmark were for many, many years to come modelled on it and all middle-aged Danes have been taught English according to the principles found in it."

Henry Sweet's views on phonetics, grammar, and historical linguistics, and his concentration on English, had a great influence on Jespersen, whose choice of the case system of English as the subject of his doctoral dissertation was probably also prompted by advice from Vilhelm Thomsen to prepare for a chair in English at the University of Copenhagen that would soon be vacant upon the retirement of George Stephens. He successfully defended his dissertation in 1891. Once installed as chair, Jespersen devoted most of his energy to the study and teaching of English, but he retained his broader interests. His prolific output was of great importance for the linguistic study of all aspects of English, for linguistics in general, and to a lesser degree for Nordic philology. Jespersen was the first great linguist to hold the chair of English at the Copenhagen, while his friend Kristoffer Nyrop had much the same role for the university's chair of French.

Jespersen continued as chair of English until he retired in 1925, following his resolve not to continue after reaching 65, in order to help make way for younger scholars.

=== General syntax ===
Jespersen advanced the concepts of rank in two papers: "Sprogets logik" (1913) and "De to hovedarter af grammatiske forbindelser" (1921); and in the latter, nexus as well. In this theory of ranks, Jespersen removes the parts of speech from the syntax, and differentiates among what he names primaries, secondaries, and tertiaries; for example, in well honed phrase, the primary is phrase, this being defined by a secondary, honed, which itself is defined by a tertiary, well.

The term nexus is applied to sentences, structures similar to sentences, and sentences in formation (in which two concepts are expressed in one unit; e.g., it rained, he ran indoors). This term is qualified by a further concept called a junction which represents one idea, expressed by means of two or more elements, whereas a nexus combines two ideas. Junction and nexus have had a mixed reception. Hjelmslev finds the distinction between them confused, and Jespersen's theory of them in need of revision: a contrast to his refinement in "Tid og tempus" (1914) of Sweet's distinction between tense (Danish tempus) and time (Danish tid).

Jespersen's work helped point the way towards linguists' current understanding of a grammatical head.

In Hjelmslev's opinion, Negation in English and Other Languages (1917) offers a great number of observations and considerable food for thought, but fails to constitute a general examination of negation, for which purpose it would have to be based on more solid materials, from a greater variety of languages (the overwhelming majority of the examples examined are from the Indo-European languages of west Europe). Jespersen coined the terms paratactic negation and resumptive negation (negation with an element added to the end of the sentence to strengthen the already negative meaning of the sentence); he also advanced understanding of negative concord.

In The Philosophy of Grammar (1924) Jespersen challenges the accepted views of common concepts in grammar and proposes corrections to the basic definitions of case, pronoun, object, voice etc., and further develops his notions of Rank and Nexus. In the 21st century this book is still used as one of the basic texts in modern structural linguistics.

With The Philosophy of Grammar particularly in mind, Noam Chomsky remarked in 1975: "I think it is fair to say that the work of recent years tends generally to support the basic ideas that Jespersen outlined 50 years ago, and extends and advances the program that he outlined."

Late in his life Jespersen published Analytic Syntax (1937), in which he presents his views on syntactic structure using an idiosyncratic shorthand notation.

Jespersen's main interest was not that of seeking patterns and explanations of the langue behind parole, but rather its opposite, the major concern of the phonetics and semantics of his youth: "the psychophysiological fact of parole". (Note: "[La grande réalité] du fait psychophysiologique de la parole")

=== Evolution and progress of languages ===
From the time of his doctoral thesis of 1891 (primarily about the disappearance over time of the case system of Old English), Jespersen maintained that language did not merely evolve over time but progressed, a notion originally inspired by Spencer's ideas on the progress of language. For the publication of the thesis in English translation (1894), Jespersen moved its subtitle to its main title, for Progress in Language: With Special Reference to English. Within it, he wrote "That language ranks highest which goes farthest in the art of accomplishing much with little means, or, in other words, which is able to express the greatest amount of meaning with the simplest mechanism." Jespersen considered the efficiency of a language's phonology, lexicon and grammar, his view of efficiency in grammar being a reaction to contrasting estimates of "synthetic" and "analytic" inflectional languages held by the brothers August Wilhelm Schlegel and Friedrich Schlegel, and Wilhelm von Humboldt.

August Schleicher was a conspicuous proponent of the idea that older languages such as Latin had attained a synthetic optimum, and languages that derived from these tended to degrade via the analytic towards an "isolating" extreme, the degree of degradation of a language increasing with "the richness and eventfulness of its speakers' history". Jespersen proposed the reverse, criticizing the needless complexities of synthetic grammar, ascribing Schleicher's evaluations to "a grammar-school admiration, a Renaissance love of [Latin and Ancient Greek] and their literatures", and commenting that "The so-called full and rich forms of the ancient languages are not a beauty but a deformity".

Whereas Schleicher conceived language as a biological phenomenon, and thus subject to processes such as maturation, ageing and death, linguists of the mid-19th century such as Georg Curtius, Johan Nikolai Madvig and William Dwight Whitney emphasized language as a human-developed tool for communication. By the end of the century this became the received conception of language.

Jespersen thought of the uses of language as needing a balance between two factors: the ease of the speaker's expression of ideas, and the distinctness of that expression (and thus the ease of comprehension for the listener). The proximate sources of the pair were Georg von der Gabelentz's Bequemlichkeitstrieb ('drive to comfort') and Deutlichkeitstrieb ('drive to distinctness', although by Deutlichkeit Gabelentz meant something broader than Jespersen's early formulations of distinctness). Although Jespersen later recognized that distinctness should include playfulness, vividness and other factors, the ability to communicate remained foremost.

As for the mechanism of grammatical change, a major interest of Jespersen's was the diachronic loss from Old English of both case inflections and freedom of word order. He showed that fixed word order did not arrive to make up for the loss of case inflections: word order became fixed before rather than after this loss. Rather, the degree of syncretism in inflection had meant that inflection had lost much of its earlier helpfulness. A later change Jespersen discussed was the disappearance of the exclusively singular second-person (thou, thee, thy, thine), which, he wrote, had merely maintained a "useless distinction" between polite and familiar terms of address or reference.

Following a description of Chinese largely deriving from Gabelentz, Jespersen's Progress in Language summarized its counter-argument to Schleicher in a pithy fashion:

The evolution of language shows a progressive tendency from inseparable irregular conglomerations to freely and regularly combinable short elements.

Schleicher's system [i.e. Schleicher's hypothesis/opinion, the reverse of the above] is to be likened to an enormous pyramid; only it is a pity that he should make its base the small, square, strong Chinese root-word, and suspend above it the inconvenient flexion-encumbered Indo-Germanic sentence-word. Structures of this sort may with some adroitness be made to stand; but their equilibrium is unstable, and sooner or later they will inevitably tumble over.

The message was well received by Chinese intellectuals such as the writer Lin Yutang, the lexicographer T. F. Chu, and the philologist Fu Ssu-nien (Fu Sinian). (Note: Lin, The Little Critic: Essays, Satires and Sketches on China: Second Series, 1933–1935 (1935); and Chu, "This easy Chinese language", The China Critic 6.35 (1933), p. 856: see Huang, Yunte (2022). Chinese Whispers: Toward a Transpacific Poetics. Chicago: University of Chicago Press. pp. 37–38. doi:10.7208/chicago/9780226822662.001.0001. ISBN 978-0-226-82264-8. (Also ISBN 978-0-226-82265-5, ISBN 978-0-226-82266-2.) Fu: see Defoort, Carine (2012). "Fu Sinian's views on philosophy, ancient Chinese masters, and Chinese philosophy". In Makeham, John (ed.). Learning to Emulate the Wise: The Genesis of Chinese Philosophy as an Academic Discipline in Twentieth-Century China. Hong Kong: Hong Kong University Press. p. 297. ISBN 978-962-996-478-8.) As for the book Progress in Language, in 1909 Karl Brugmann listed it among six "indispensable books for a first approach to [linguistics]". (Note: The other five: Berthold Delbrück (1889) Einleitung in das Sprachstudium. Ein Beitrag zur Geschiehte und Methodik der vergleichenden Sprachforschung; Hanns Oertel (1901) Lectures on the Study of Language; Hermann Paul (1880) Principien der Sprachgeschichte (later editions spell the title Prinzipien . . .); William Dwight Whitney (1867) Language and the Study of Language: Twelve Lectures on the Principles of Linguistic Science; Wilhelm Wundt (1900) Völkerpsychologie. Eine Untersuchung der Entwicklungsgesetze von Sprache, Mythus und Sitte. I. Die Sprache.)

Unlike Gabelentz, Jespersen was interested in extending the concepts of analyticity and efficiency to international auxiliary languages. Within negotiations among the Delegation for the Adoption of an International Auxiliary Language aimed at deciding which constructed language should receive the international backing of scholars, the greatest supporter of Jespersen's principles was the chemist Wilhelm Ostwald, who had his own theory of Energetik ('energetics'), and for whom "Language was . . . a domain of culture calling out to be optimized through deliberate intervention". Thus for Jespersen, progress towards communicative efficiency is anyway inevitable, but can also be assisted by language engineering.

Hjelmslev criticizes the ambiguity of "efficiency" and "effort"; and adds that even if these are understood only loosely, there have been counter-examples. (Note: For the description of counter-examples, Hjelmslev particularly credits Collinder, Björn (1941). Introduktion i Språkvetenskapen [Introduction to linguistics] (in Swedish). Stockholm: Hugo Geber. OCLC 769852250.) He concludes that, as propounded by Jespersen, the thesis is far from convincing, but that it is put forward vividly and has aroused considerable interest.

Jespersen's conception of evolution soon came to differ from Spencer's. Whereas Spencer believed that increased heterogeneity – synonymy, and the generation of new word classes, dialects and even languages – indicated progress, Jespersen found progress in simplicity and uniformity and:

Jespersen praised the " 'noiseless' machinery" of English, (Note: Jespersen, Otto (1942). A Modern English Grammar on Historical Principles, Part VI: Morphology. Copenhagen: Ejnar Munksgaard. p. 85. OCLC 220412299 – via Internet Archive. (McElvenny cites the 1954 edition; its pagination is the same.) Jespersen writes this in the context of "the formal identity of a great many words belonging to different word-classes" (largely thanks to conversion).) the modern European language furthest down the analytic path, and the language most despised by Schleicher precisely for what he regarded as this analytic degeneracy.

In a review of Efficiency in Linguistic Change, Bernard Bloch was forthright in saying that while linguists, like anyone else, were entitled to their private opinions on the relative merits of languages, judging the utility or attractiveness of a language was not part of their job. But although Bloch was an American structuralist, largely following Leonard Bloomfield, his reaction was much more extreme than that of Bloomfield, who thought that tackling questions such as relative efficiency was not improper, but instead better postponed until the factors involved were better understood.

A very different kind of opposition to Jespersen's conception came from Charles Bally, whose stylistics concerns led him to concentrate on the affective dimension of language, for which processes such as polysemy and clipping are important, and thus to reject efficiency as an ideal. Bally's objections to received opinions on language evolution extended beyond this: for example, he claimed that the change from "synthetic" to "analytic" was at times reversed (as Hermann Möller had pointed out to Jespersen as early as 1891).

Hans Frede Nielsen has criticized Jespersen's lack of consistency in, for example, approving the development of new, periphrastic (and, thanks to ‑ing, inflectional) tenses for allowing new distinctions and nuances that enriched English, while also approving the loss in English of the subjunctive and thus the distinctions and nuances that it had enabled.

From the 18th down to the mid-19th century, the origins of language had been an unusually contentious subject, based on little more than speculation – to the point where in 1866 the Société de Linguistique de Paris banned communications about the subject. The ban, which lasted a decade, had an influence far beyond the Société but seems to have done little to deter Jespersen.

Jespersen argued that none among the "several types of glottogenetic hypotheses" in the 1866 typology of Max Müller – the "bow-wow" theory (that protolanguage imitated sounds in nature), the "pooh-pooh" theory (derivation from interjections), and the "yo-he-yo" theory (from field hollers and similar) – should be dismissed because of its inability to explain the distant origin of this or that "part" of language. Rather, each of the three may explain certain parts, "and not even the most important parts – the main body of language seems hardly to be touched by any of them".

Jespersen's version of the bow-wow theory in particular may seem farfetched:

Humboldt held the view . . . that the origin of language lies in the natural urge to produce art. . . . [The idea, which] originated most probably with Vico . . . lived on till the beginning of the 20th century. Jespersen . . . emphatically denies, against all evidence, the romanticist background of this theory, [yet] still defends the thesis that language originated in song, in love play and otherwise. . . . Nowadays [this view] is entirely forgotten.

However, Salikoko Mufwene suggests that such speculations by Jespersen are less important than his belief that study of early, prelinguistic communication by infants – "cooing, babbling, and gestures" – may illuminate the origins of language.

Mufwene points out that Jespersen's conception of the long-term evolution of language is opposed to that published decades later by Derek Bickerton, for whom the protolanguage was very simple and "had minimal syntax, if any":

While Bickerton sees in pidgins fossils of that protolanguage and in creoles the earliest forms of complex grammar that could putatively evolve from them, Jespersen would perhaps see in them the ultimate stage of the evolution of language to date. Many of us today find it difficult to side with one or the other position.

Jespersen's writing on these matters can be unpalatable:

Rather outrageous is Jespersen's claim that languages of "savages" in Africa and the Americas could inform us about the origins of language, not only because they have longer words (with complex morphology), but also because they use difficult sounds such as clicks and rely on tones, which, according to him, suggests that their speakers are "passionate". "Primitive languages" were accordingly sung, poetic, and figurative.

Richard C. Smith considers Language: Its Nature, Development and Origin to be Jespersen's "masterpiece".

Jespersen advanced the study of the Great Vowel Shift, and was the first to present it in diagram form; he also coined its name. (Note: More precisely, Jespersen writes "the great vowel-shift": with a hyphen, and not capitalized. Jespersen, Otto (1961) [1909]. A Modern English Grammar on Historical Principles. Part I: Sounds and Spellings. London: George Allen & Unwin. pp. 231–247.)

=== Child language ===
The work of Jespersen's that addresses child language most extensively is Nutidssprog hos Børn og Voxne ("Today's language in children and adults", 1916), and its second edition, Børnesprog: En Bog for Foraldre ("Children's language: A book for parents", 1923). Their content, and that of Sproget: Barnet, Kvinden, Slægten (1941), is summarized within Language: Its Nature, Development, and Origin (1922). Jespersen distinguishes himself, as a linguist, from psychologists and educationalists such as Wilhelm Wundt, William Stern, and Vilhelm Rasmussen, criticizing them for faults such as the ambiguity of estimates of vocabulary when what are counted are ill-defined, (Note: It is often unclear whether for example I and me have been counted as two different words or as a single word having differing inflectional forms; also, whether an expression such as eggcup (a compound in adult language) has been taken as a compound or merely a concatenation of its constituents.) and criticizing Wundt in particular for his belief that children participate only passively in what is largely an environmental generation of language.

Jespersen writes of three major stages in first language acquisition: screaming (perceived as language-like by the addressee, if not by the producer), babbling, and talking; and of talking as itself having two stages: own language and common language. He observes that production of speech comes later than understanding (although it can be hard to gauge understanding when not accompanied by production). He deals with issues of lexical semantics, and "a child's acquisition of his mother tongue is, in general, a complex process of guessing, supposing and inventing, not only in the field of language but also in the fields of reality and conception". Children's inventiveness encompasses conversion and blending. Taking the use of prepositions to illustrate the acquisition of syntactic structure, Jespersen points out that what linguists now regard as preposition phrases first appear as formulas (thus to might first appear in "go to bed") and only later in novel combinations.

Jespersen emphasizes the role of young children's linguistic awareness: although they lack the ability to talk about language, awareness can be observed from their reactions to errors by others, from their hesitations, and from their playful alterations of language.

Jespersen also considers the relationship between meanings of words in child language and the concepts held by those children; he suggests that the influence can work in either direction.

=== International auxiliary languages ===
Jespersen applied both his theories on grammar and his ideas of efficiency of expression into the quest for an international auxiliary language.

It is true that towards the end of his life Jespersen expressed some qualms about the time and energy he had invested in [artificial languages; but his] interest in the matter covered practically his whole life, from his rejection of Volapük in his student days to suggested reforms in his own creation Novial a few years before his death.

==== The Delegation for the Adoption of an International Auxiliary Language, and Ido ====
In 1907 Louis Couturat called a meeting of the Delegation for the Adoption of an International Auxiliary Language to decide on a single language for recommendation for international use. As an Anglicist, Jespersen might have been expected to back English for this role, but he rejected such a notion on the grounds that:

- a deliberate choice of any one [national] language for such a purpose would meet with unsurmountable difficulties on account of international jealousies
- each of them is several times more difficult than a constructed language need be

As for constructed languages, these were thought of as having either of two goals. There were languages primarily designed to encourage clarity of thought, and those primarily based on (but simplifying) existing, widely spoken languages—although examples of the former type had a tendency to develop towards the latter type. Volapük, which had approached the former (and whose words were built on unrecognizable roots), had recently suffered a rapid decrease in speaker population, eclipsed by Esperanto. Thus the favourites for endorsement by the Delegation were Esperanto (which had regular morphology and was largely based on Romance languages), and Idiom Neutral (which had less stress on regularity and was based on what was already shared by the most prominent languages of Europe). Of the two, Idiom Neutral was more to Jespersen's liking.

A complex and shady process involved the sudden nomination by somebody using the pseudonym "Ido" of a newly conceived revision of Esperanto. Despite learning of the deception made by or for the pseudonymous reviser, and despite his anger over this deception, Jespersen believed candidate languages should be judged purely on their merits, and that this revision (which itself came to be called Ido) was a significant improvement over Esperanto in its state at the time. However, L. L. Zamenhof, Esperanto's creator, was opposed to it, as was the Esperantists' Lingva Komitato, and Ido became a rival of Esperanto. Jespersen collaborated with Louis Couturat and others on International Language and Science (1910), a book advocating its adoption; and became president of an Ido academy. But although a significant increase in its number of speakers would have required Ido to mobilize its speakers and evangelize, such a project did not attract Jespersen, who wanted "a language for the brain, not for the heart".

==== The International Auxiliary Language Association ====
In 1925 Jespersen met Alice Morris, a wealthy cofounder (and lasting financial supporter) of the International Auxiliary Language Association (IALA). "[U]nlike its counterparts in the international auxiliary language movement in Europe, there was in IALA little of the fanaticism, the eccentricity, and even the mysticism that accompanied the promotion of languages such as Esperanto." Through Morris and the IALA, Jespersen also met Edgar de Wahl, creator of the language Occidental and others with whom he could discuss the possibilities for constructed languages.

Jespersen's active participation in the IALA included chairing an IALA-funded conference, the Meeting of Linguistic Research, held in Geneva in spring 1930; but perhaps more important to IALA was the prestige he brought. Before the involvement in IALA, and later the formal association with it, of American scholars such as Edward Sapir, Earle Babcock, Henry A. Todd, and John L. Gerig, and the Europeans W. E. Collinson and Jespersen, many in academia thought international auxiliary languages pointless and a waste of time; but now "the organization and the movement could – and did – claim scholarly legitimacy for its linguistic research".

Morris viewed the issues involved in constructing a language to be mainly those of the lexicon. She and Jespersen (writing in a 1929 article, "Nature and art in language") were not unusual:

The proponents, the creators, and the analysts of artificial languages all concentrated on lexicon and derivational morphology. Syntax warranted no special attention. Being 'natural', it would take care of itself, or so it seemed to many of the enthusiasts most responsible for actually constructing auxiliary languages.

==== Novial ====
Jespersen believed that constructed languages, Ido included, were still more complex than needed, and still differed more than necessary from widely spoken national languages. He therefore set out to create an improved language, Novial (Nov 'new' + IAL 'International Auxiliary Language'). His significant publications here include An International Language; Novial Lexike (a dictionary); and "A new science: Interlinguistics" (Note: Jespersen, Otto (1931). "A new science: Interlinguistics". Psyche: An Annual of General and Linguistic Psychology. 11: 57–67. Also in Jespersen, Otto (1931). "Interlinguistics". In Shenton, Herbert N.; Sapir, Edward; Jespersen, Otto (eds.). International Communication: A Symposium on the Language Problem. Psyche Miniatures 37. London: Kegan Paul, Trench, Trubner. OCLC 2805609. Also in Selected Writings. 1960. Pp. 771–782. Selected Writings. 2010. Pp. 422–429.) (all published 1928–1931). Novial had a mixed reception (the Esperantist Gaston Waringhien found it particularly unsatisfactory), and Jespersen was hobbled by the mutual incompatibility of regularity and perceived naturalness as goals. Oddly, Novial also lacked some of the features that Jespersen had praised in English, such as consonant-ending monosyllabic words, and conversion without a need for inflection.

Larsen urges his readers:

But rather than judge [projects such as Novial] by their actual or potential contribution to international communication, we are better advised . . . to see [Jespersen's] life-long preoccupation with auxiliary languages and his creation of Novial not as a heroic failure but as a revealing application of his linguistic thought.

=== English ===
Terms related to English that were introduced by Jespersen and are still widely used today include cleft sentence, content clause, light verb, mass noun, quantifier, and yes-or-no question. Jespersen's writings have also influenced today's conceptions of existential sentence.

In his own work The Syntactic Phenomena of English (1988), James D. McCawley attributes various of his analyses, or the insights pointing towards them, to Jespersen: raising; "worthwhile criticism of traditional systems of parts of speech" and classification of what are traditionally termed "subordinating conjunctions" (as in "You must look at this before you leave") as prepositions with sentential objects; and more specifically, classification of that in relative clauses (as in "The necktie that he bought was polyester") not as a relative pronoun but as a complementizer. Asked how the 20th-century Dutch grammarians of English Hendrik Poutsma, Etsko Kruisinga and R. W. Zandvoort compared with Jespersen, McCawley replied: "Of course, Jespersen is in a class by himself. He was a fantastically original, broad, and deep thinker."

Robert I. Binnick calls Jespersen "one of the greatest students of the English language . . . , at once the last of the traditional grammarians and the first modern linguist–grammarian".

==== A Modern English Grammar on Historical Principles ====
Jespersen's specialism for the longest period was the English language. His most celebrated work, and easily his most expansive, was A Modern English Grammar on Historical Principles, published in six "parts" (volumes) during his lifetime, from 1909 to 1942, and a seventh, posthumous part in 1949. The first part is devoted to phonetics (much of it historical), the sixth to morphology (both derivational and inflectional). The other five are devoted to syntax, which Jespersen particularly enjoyed. (Note: "When I took up work again after a rest necessitated by over-strain during a nine months' stay in America, I wanted something pleasurable to do and thought Syntax more attractive than Morphology. . . ." Jespersen, Otto (1954) [1914]. A Modern English Grammar on Historical Principles. Part II: Syntax (first volume). London: George Allen & Unwin. p. v – via Internet Archive.)

Writing in Jespersen's obituary, Helmslev calls A Modern English Grammar a "monumental work", one that "will maintain its immense value for an incalculable future thanks to the rich documentation of facts it provides". (Note: "[Un] œuvre monumentale. . . . Ce grand ouvrage . . . conservera pour un avenir incalculable une très haute valeur par la riche documentation de faits qu'il apporte.")

==== Other works on English ====
Growth and Structure of the English Language (1905, and reprinted at numerous times thereafter) is a broad history of the English language. It won Jespersen the Prix Volney. In 1989, Hans Frede Nielsen wrote that:

[It] can be read as the homage paid by an Anglophile to the English language which is praised for its business-like, virile qualities, its conciseness, logic and sobriety — to say nothing of its noble, rich, pliant and expressive character. . . . No wonder that [the book] became so popular in the English-speaking world and among Anglophiles elsewhere.

He described it as "probably the most widely read introduction to the history of the English language ever written".

Essentials of English Grammar (1933), primarily intended for university teaching, is for the most part synchronic. W. Nelson Francis described it as "arguably [Jespersen's] most familiar and popular book".

=== Women's language ===
Jespersen has been cited as "a pioneer in the study of women's language [and] often quoted for his views on what he believed to be the biologically determined nature of women's usage" – although "[a] product of his own day and age".

Linguists since Jespersen have been less patient with the content of "The woman", chapter 13 within his book Language: Its Nature, Development and Origin (1922): (Note: The chapter is largely a reproduction of a 1907 magazine article, Jespersen (1907). As described in Thomas (2013, p. 390).) "he manages to include every stereotype about women that was current at the time"; "[the chapter offers] a compendium – and a grim one for that matter, filled with prejudices and misogyny – of long-standing commonplaces on women's contribution to the development of language."

Margaret Thomas writes:

Jespersen's Chapter 13 is now read as the prime early example of conventional stereotypes and preconceptions about women's language that consider it inherently defective relative to men's language. As such, Jespersen's text is introduced into accounts of the history of language and gender studies in tones that range from detached amusement to derision.

Thomas continues by summarizing how Deborah Cameron reprints what she calls "Jespersen's notorious chapter" in toto, Kira Hall describes it as "infamous", Patrick Mahony demonstrates how it exhibits "androcentric ideology" and "chauvinism", and Jennifer Coates makes multiple references to Language, Its Nature, Development and Origin as a whole.

Chapter 13, "The woman", is one of five chapters making up "Book III" of Language: Its Nature, Development and Origin, a Book in which "Jespersen describes and speculates about the influence of what he considers three other major factors in language change": multilingualism and language contact, pidgins and creoles, and women. While claiming that the differences between women's and men's language contribute to such change, his descriptions of these differences tend to make limited concessions to claims made by others, downplaying their scope or significance Thomas summarizes Jespersen's judgments as made in a tone "not so much distasteful, much less scornful, toward women and women's language as it is indulgent and condescending"; "Jespersen's assessment of women's language overall cannot be represented as disparaging"; he "does not seem to present women's language as a deformed version of men's language".

On its first publication (1922), numerous, mostly favourable reviews were published of Language: Its Nature, Development and Origin. But its chapter 13 "received scant attention from contemporary readers". Thomas finds only one review that comments substantively on the chapter: that in The Modern Language Review by W. E. Collinson. This did not criticize Jespersen's methodology (quite inadequate from today's perspective, normal in its time); nevertheless, "Collinson alone took Jespersen's claims seriously, but downplayed them as inaccurate and overblown."

Thomas sees Jespersen's "The woman" (taken together with the Danish-language versions: the 1907 article and the 1941 book) as "an essentially singular, isolated, text that had little precedent or following for another fifty years". But the rediscovery of (societal) gender differences in language as a subject for study, led in the mid-1970s by Robin Lakoff and Cheris Kramer, brought considerable commentary in feminist linguistics, based on descriptions of the chapter ranging from accurate, to simplifying, to distorting. Thomas approvingly quotes Deborah Cameron: (Note: "Deborah Cameron, who, like Kira Hall, is an unusually close reader of Jespersen. . . .") "If you read the whole chapter in which Jespersen expounds on the subject of 'The Woman', it becomes clear that he is adopting a view of languages as ideally balanced between 'masculine' and 'feminine' elements".

=== Scholarly influences and allegiances ===
Niels Haislund comments:

The three Danish scholars Vilhelm Thomsen, Karl Verner and Hermann Möller, Johan Storm the Norwegian (Englische Philologie), and Sweet probably are those teachers to whom Otto Jespersen owes most, no doubt he was Sweet's dearest pupil.

During the decades of his activity, Jespersen followed what other, younger linguists were doing but refrained from unreservedly welcoming any advance, let alone from aligning himself with any new approach. He remained individualistic, but "there was a conservative streak in his radicalism" (Note: "[I]l y avait dans son radicalisme un trait conservateur") as he seemed to take seriously only the standpoints that had influenced him in his youth and to interpret newer work as mere repetition of this or that older theory.

Hans Basbøll sees many followers of Jespersen in Denmark. He has coined the term "New Jespersen School" (Ny-Jespersenianerne) for "the main editors of [Den store danske Udtaleordbog (a major pronunciation dictionary for Danish)], namely, Lars Brink, Jørn Lund and Steffen Heger, and their collaborators and pupils"; their major achievement aside from SDU has been Brink and Lund's two-volume historical phonetics work Dansk Rigsmål (1975).

Rather than naming Jespersen's adherents in each of the various other areas of linguistics of interest to Jespersen, Basbøll chooses to describe only a single line of succession, in the study of Danish grammar. In the preface to his 1901 book Synspunkter for Dansk Sproglære, H. G. Wiwel expresses his gratitude to Jespersen, (Note: Immediately after thanking the Carlsberg Foundation: "Næsten endnu mere skylder jeg professor O. Jespersen, som på flere måder har vist en interesse for mit arbejde, uden hvilken dette vist endnu længe var forblevet inter penetralia Vestæ." ("I almost owe even more to Professor O. Jespersen, who in several ways has shown an interest in my work, without which it would probably have long remained inter penetralia Vestae ['among the chambers of Vesta' (more commonly intra penetralia Vestae, i.e. 'within' them)].") Wiwel, H[ylling] G[eorg] (1901). Synspunkter for Dansk Sproglære [Viewpoints for Danish grammar] (in Danish). Copenhagen: E. Bojesen. OCLC 16307257 – via Internet Archive.) who in turn praised Wiwel's book, if guardedly. The book harshly criticized the work of Kristian Mikkelsen: unjustly so, in the opinion of Paul Diderichsen. According to Basbøll, in a "large scientific grammar of Danish" of 2011 by Erik Hansen and Lars Heltoft, Wiwel is among the earlier grammarians who "play a significant role", and so Jespersen "still has a heavy share of today's tradition of Danish grammar".

More broadly, Olli O. Silvennoinen sees Jespersen's compatibility with, or encouragement for, late 20th-century functionalism, and "communicative pressures on language structure" (thanks to his "Darwinist and teleological approach to language change"); mainstream generative grammar (thanks to his "emphasis on universal principles underlying superficial variation across languages"); non-mainstream generative grammar (thanks to his "empirical richness and theoretical depth"); and corpus linguistics (thanks to copious provision of attested examples).

== Travels and honours ==
Jespersen visited the United States twice: he lectured at the Congress of Arts and Sciences in St. Louis in 1904, (Note: The Congress was related to the St. Louis World's Fair: "the International Congress of Arts and Science to be held in St. Louis from the nineteenth to the twenty-fifth of September, 1904, in connection with and on the invitation of the World's Fair". Münsterberg, Hugo (2010) [1905]. "The International Congress of Arts and Sciences". The Mead Project – via Brock University.) and in 1909–1910 at the University of California at Berkeley, Columbia University (New York), the University of Chicago, Harvard University, and Wellesley College (Wellesley, Massachusetts).

After his retirement in 1925, Jespersen remained active in the international linguistic community. As well as continuing to write, he convened and chaired the first International Meeting on Linguistic Research in Geneva in 1930, co-chaired the first International Congress of Linguists in The Hague in 1928, and presided over the fourth in Copenhagen in 1936.

Jespersen received honorary degrees from Columbia University (1910), the University of St Andrews in Scotland (1925), and the Sorbonne in Paris (1927). He was one of the first six international scholars to be elected as honorary members of the Linguistic Society of America. He was elected a foreign member of the Royal Netherlands Academy of Arts and Sciences in 1931.

== Books by Jespersen ==
Even Hovdhaugen et al. describe Jespersen's output:

[Jespersen's] textbooks and numerous other books gave readers balanced, although not uncritical, information on what was going on in the field of linguistics. Jespersen had a broad theoretical orientation, was interested in all subsystems of language, and invoked examples from many different languages in a way that made him a precursor of language typology.

- Praktisk Tilegnelse af fremmede Sprog ("Practical acquisition of foreign languages"). [A translation of Felix Franke, Die praktische Spracherlernung auf Grund der Psychologie und Physiologie der Sprache dargestellt von Felix Franke.] Copenhagen: Carl Larsen, 1884. OCLC 466303017.
- Kortfattet engelsk Grammatik for Tale- og Skriftsproget ("A concise English grammar for the spoken and written language"). Copenhagen: Carl Larsen, 1885. OCLC 477786006. (Also later editions.)
- Fransk Læsebog efter Lydskriftsmethode ("A French reader using the phonetic method"). Copenhagen, 1889.
- The Articulations of Speech Sounds Represented by Means of Analphabetic Symbols. Marburg: N.G. Elwert, 1889. OCLC 903926262. At the Internet Archive; Again at the Internet Archive.
- Studier over engelske Kasus. Med en Indledning om Fremskridt i Sproget ("Studies on case in English: With an introduction on progress in language"). [Jespersen's doctoral dissertation.] Copenhagen: Kleins Vorlag, 1891. OCLC 457568603.
  - Progress in Language: With Special Reference to English. London: Swan Sonnenschein, 1894. OCLC 607098829. At the Internet Archive. New York: Macmillan & Co. Amsterdam and Philadelphia: John Benjamins, 1993; with an introduction by James D. McCawley. ISBN 9789027219923, ISBN 9781556193149. Abingdon, Oxfordshire: Routledge, 2006. ISBN 978-0-415-40258-3. Abingdon, Oxfordshire: Routledge, 2013. ISBN 978-0-415-86027-7. [Jespersen's adaptation of his doctoral dissertation.]
  - Chapters on English. London: George Allen & Unwin, 1918. OCLC 8977427. [Excerpted from Progress in Language.] Selected Writings. 1960. Pp. 153–346. Selected Writings. 2010. Pp. 81–165.
- Chaucers Liv og Digtning ("Chaucer's life and poetry"). Studier fra Sprog- og Oldtidsforskning. Copenhagen: Klein, 1893. OCLC 246601722.
- With Chr[istian] Sarauw. Engelsk Begynderbog ("English primer"). 1895. OCLC 476427495. (Later often reprinted.)
- Fonetik: En systematisk Fremstilling af Læren om Sproglyd ("Phonetics: A systematic presentation of the study of the sounds of language"). Copenhagen: Schubotheske Forlag, 1899. OCLC 185591363.
  - Phonetische Grundfragen ("Phonetics essentials"). Leipzig: B.G. Teubner, 1904. OCLC 1020799. [German translation by N. Andersen and Hermann Davidsen of portions of Fonetik; with additions written by Jespersen.]
  - Lehrbuch der Phonetik ("Textbook of phonetics"). Leipzig: B.G. Teubner, 1904. OCLC 1159076996. (Also later editions.) [German translation by Hermann Davidsen of portions of Fonetik.]
- Sprogundervisning ("Language teaching"). Copenhagen: Det Schubotheske forlag, 1901. OCLC 16159085. 2nd ed. ("revised, less polemical"). Copenhagen: Gyldendalske Boghandel, 1935. OCLC 29990346.
  - How to Teach a Foreign Language. Translation by Sophia Yhlen-Olsen Bertelsen of Sprogundervisning. London: George Allen & Unwin, 1904. OCLC 1017209528. London: S. Sonnenschein, 1904. 1904 printing and 1928 printing at the Internet Archive. Abingdon, Oxfordshire: Routledge, 2007. ISBN 978-0-415-40245-3. Abingdon, Oxfordshire: Routledge, 2010. ISBN 978-0-415-61130-5.
- The England and America Reader. Copenhagen, 1904.
  - A British Reader: Nybearb. af "The England and America Reader". 1931. OCLC 467735339. Edited by C.A. Bodelsen and H. Helweg-Møller.
- Growth and Structure of the English Language. Leipzig: B.G. Teubner; New York: G.E. Stechert, 1905. OCLC 4287175. New York: Free Press, 1968. OCLC 1035146783. Free Press edition. Chicago: University of Chicago Press; Oxford: Basil Blackwell, 1982; with a foreword by Randolph Quirk. ISBN 9780226398778, ISBN 9780631129868, ISBN 9780631129875.
- Modersmålets Fonetik ("Phonetics of the mother tongue"). Copenhagen: Schubotheske, 1906. OCLC 29995287. (Revised and augmented in later editions.)
- John Hart's Pronunciation of English (1569 and 1570). Heidelberg: Carl Winter, 1907. Anglistische Forschungen, Heft 22. OCLC 1907819. At the Internet Archive. [About the content of John Hart's An Orthographie (1569) and A Methode or Comfortable Beginning for All Vnlearned, Whereby They May Bee Taught to Read English (1570).]
- A Modern English Grammar on Historical Principles. Seven "parts" (volumes), 1909–1949. Earliest parts first published by Carl Winter (Heidelberg), later parts by Ejnar Munksgaard (Copenhagen) and George Allen & Unwin (London). Parts 5–7, issued without series title, have imprint: Copenhagen, E. Munksgaard, 1940–1949; Imprint varies: Parts 5–6: London: George Allen & Unwin; part 7: Copenhagen: Munksgaard, London: George Allen & Unwin. (See also "Publishing details".)
- Engelsk Fonetik. Copenhagen: Nordisk, 1912. Edited by H. Helwig-Møller. OCLC 961067561.
  - English Phonetics: A Handbook for Scandinavian Students. Copenhagen: Gyldendal, 1950. OCLC 465861807. Revised and translated by Bengt Jürgensen.
- Sprogets Logik ("The logic of language"). Copenhagen: J. H. Schultz, 1913. OCLC 952935015.
- Nutidssprog hos Børn og Voxne ("Today's language in children and adults"). Copenhagen: Nordisk forlag, 1916. OCLC 8661242.
  - Børnesprog: En Bog for Foraldre ("Children's language: A book for parents"). Copenhagen: Gyldendal, 1923. OCLC 492461187. A revision of Nutidssprog.
- Negation in English and Other Languages. Det Kongelige Danske Videnskabernes Selskab: Historisk-filologiske Meddelelser I, 5. Copenhagen: Andr. Fred. Høst og søn, 1917. OCLC 457568567. At the Internet Archive; at the Royal Danish Academy of Sciences and Letters. Edited by Brett Reynolds and Peter Evans; with an introduction by Olli O. Silvennoinen. Berlin: Language Science Press, 2025. Classics in Linguistics. doi:10.5281/zenodo.14843487. ISBN 978-3-96110-500-7. At Language Science Press. Selected Writings. 1960. Pp. 1–152. Selected Writings. 2010. Pp. 2–80.
- Rasmus Rask i Hundredåret efter hans Hovedværk ("Rasmus Rask a hundred years after his major work"). Copenhagen: Gyldendal, 1918. OCLC 561462317. At Danskernes Historie Online.
- De to Hovedarter av grammattiske Forbindelser ("The two main types of grammatical relations"). Det Kongelige Danske Videnskabernes Selskab: Historisk-filologiske Meddelelser IV, 3. Copenhagen: Andr. Fred. Høst og søn, 1921. OCLC 16310596. At the Royal Danish Academy of Sciences and Letters.
- Language: Its Nature, Development, and Origin. London: George Allen & Unwin, 1922. OCLC 1523115677. At the Internet Archive. London: George Allen & Unwin, 1968. ISBN 0-04-400007-3. Abingdon, Oxfordshire: Routledge, 2007. ISBN 978-0-415-40247-7. Abingdon, Oxfordshire: Routledge, 2013. ISBN 978-0-415-84556-4.
- The Philosophy of Grammar. London: George Allen & Unwin, 1924. OCLC 308037. At the Internet Archive. New York: Henry Holt, 1924. OCLC 19939152. New York: W. W. Norton, 1965. OCLC 1120578615. Chicago: University of Chicago Press, 1992; with an introduction by James D. McCawley. ISBN 0-226-39881-1. Abingdon, Oxfordshire: Routledge, 2006. ISBN 978-0-415-40257-6. Abingdon, Oxfordshire: Routledge, 2010. ISBN 978-0-415-86027-7.
- Mankind, Nation and Individual: From a Linguistic Point of View. Instituttet for Sammenlignende Kulturforskning. [Publikationer] ser. A.: Forelesninger 4. Oslo: H. Aschehoug; Leipzig: Otto Harrassowitz; Paris: Honoré Champion; London: Williams & Norgate; Cambridge, Massachusetts: Harvard University Press, 1925. OCLC 1445547. At the Internet Archive. Abingdon, Oxfordshire: Routledge, 2006. ISBN 978-0-415-40248-4. Abingdon, Oxfordshire: Routledge, 2013. ISBN 978-0-415-86461-9.
- Sprogets Udvikling og Opstaaen ("The development and origin of language"). Copenhagen: V. Pio, 1926. OCLC 466067329.
- Et Verdenssprog: Et Forsøg på Spørsmålets Løsning ("A world language: An attempt to solve the question"). Copenhagen: V. Pios, 1928. OCLC 925814712.
- An International Language. London: George Allen & Unwin, 1928. OCLC 251023739. At Österreichische Nationalbibliothek. Abingdon, Oxfordshire: Routledge, 2006. ISBN 978-0-415-40246-0. Abingdon, Oxfordshire: Routledge, 2013. ISBN 978-0-415-84526-7. [Paris]: Feedbooks, n.d. Archived by the Wayback Machine on 21 August 2018. [The introduction of the Novial language.]
- Novial Lexike: International Dictionary = Dictionnaire international = Internationales Wörterbuch. Heidelberg: Carl Winter, 1930. OCLC 39992226. Abingdon, Oxfordshire: Routledge, 2006. ISBN 978-0-415-40256-9. Abingdon, Oxfordshire: Routledge, 2013. ISBN 978-0-415-86464-0. Text file edition, blahedo.org (Don Blaheta). [Novial to English, French and German dictionary.]
- Tanker og Studier ("Thoughts and studies"). Copenhagen: Gyldendalske Boghandel, 1932. OCLC 1508095448. [Collection of papers in Danish.]
- Linguistica: Selected Papers in English, French and German. London: George Allen & Unwin; Copenhagen: Levin & Munksgaard, 1933. OCLC 459619574. At Internet Archive. College Park, Maryland: McGrath, 1970. OCLC 1000569708. Abingdon, Oxfordshire: Routledge, 2015. ISBN 9781317439363, ISBN 9781315694368, ISBN 9781317439349, ISBN 9781317439356, ISBN 9781138908284, ISBN 9781138908529.
- Essentials of English Grammar. London: George Allen & Unwin, 1933. (And later impressions.) OCLC 1593202. Tokyo: Kaitakusha (開拓社), 1943. 2nd ed. 1944. NCID BA12049306. University of Alabama Press, 1965. OCLC 561462021. Abingdon, Oxfordshire: Routledge, 2006. ISBN 978-0-415-40244-6. Abingdon, Oxfordshire: Routledge, 2013. ISBN 978-0-415-84746-9. [Greatly condensed derivative of A Modern English Grammar.]
- Specimens of Syntactic Formulas: A Preliminary Account Dedicated to the Fourth International Congress of Linguistics. Copenhagen: Levin & Munksgaard, 1936. OCLC 1457229874. [Booklet; a preliminary version of Analytic Syntax (1937).]
- Analytic Syntax: A System of Expressing Grammatical Formulae by Symbols. London: George Allen & Unwin, [1937]. OCLC 5154890. Copenhagen: Levin & Munksgaard, 1937. OCLC 1469370. New York: Rinehart & Winston, 1969. OCLC 463148117. Tokyo: Senjo, 1971. OCLC 21741533. Chicago: University of Chicago Press, 1984; with an introduction by James D. McCawley. ISBN 0-226-39880-3.
- En Sprogmands Levned ("A linguist's life"). Copenhagen, 1938. OCLC 7136679. [Jespersen's autobiography.]
  - A Linguist's Life: An English Translation of Otto Jespersen's Autobiography with Notes, Photos and a Bibliography. Translated by David Stoner, edited by Arne Juul, Hans Frede Nielsen and Jørgen Erik Nielsen, foreword by Paul Christophersen. Odense: Odense University Press, 1995. (ISBN 87-7838-132-0)
- Sproget: Barnet, Kvinden, Slægten ("Language: Child, woman, family"). Copenhagen: Gyldendal, 1941. OCLC 247794469.
- Efficiency in Linguistic Change. Det Kongelige Danske Videnskabernes Selskab. Historisk-filosofiske Meddelelser 27, 4, 1941. 2nd ed. Copenhagen: Ejnar Munksgaard, 1949. 3rd ed. Copenhagen: Ejnar Munksgaard, 1969. At the Royal Danish Academy of Sciences and Letters. Selected Writings. 1960. Pp. 381–466. Selected Writings. 2010. Pp. 190–231.
- Selected Writings. London: George Allen & Unwin; Tokyo: Senjo, 1960. OCLC 213821474. At the Internet Archive. London: Routledge, 2010. ISBN 978-0-415-57137-1, ISBN 978-0-203-85719-9.

== Political and other views ==
Jespersen was "an idealist and a pacifist"; and "It is no surprise that Jespersen, with his communicative view of language, his work in foreign language teaching, and his pacifism, should have been attracted to the idea of an international language."

He was "a rationalist and a radical". And "typical of his approach" was Jespersen's application of:

the formula I put forward in 1908, and which since then has been very often quoted by Idists: That international language is best which in every point offers the greatest facility to the greatest number (modelled, of course, on Hutcheson's and Bentham's famous dictum: That action is best, which accomplishes the greatest happiness for the greatest numbers).

Politically, Jespersen leant to the left:

By temperament he belonged to no party for he could never endorse any party-political platform to the full, but he was closest to the Social Democrats in their ideas about social justice, equal opportunity and the like

He had a "dislike of anything that is stilted and pretentious and aimed at making the writer appear more important than he is".

Lack of respect for authority and tradition was an important part of Jespersen's personality. . . . Intellectually Jespersen's inclination to go his own way expressed itself in scepticism and an urge to contradict.

== Personal life ==
As a student, Jespersen enjoyed chess and reading French and English literature.

Jespersen married Ane Marie Djørup on 13 April 1897; the couple, later together with their son (Frans), lived in Frederiksberg (administratively outside Copenhagen but geographically part of it), until their move in 1901 to Ermelundsly, a large house in Jægersborg, near Gentofte. In 1934 they again moved, to Lundehave, a large house in the outskirts of Helsingør, provided by the Royal Danish Academy of Sciences and Letters for a distinguished academician.

Ane Marie died on 30 March 1937. Jespersen became ill in December 1942; he died on 30 April 1943, and his urn was interred in a cemetery at Helsingør.

== Works cited ==
- Aarts, Bas; Chalker, Sylvia; Weiner, Edmund (2014). The Oxford Dictionary of English Grammar (2nd ed.). Oxford: Oxford University Press. ISBN 978-0-19-174444-0.
- Basbøll, Hans (2021). "Otto Jespersen: A great phonetician and linguist in his Danish context". In Qu, Changliang (ed.). 叶斯柏森论语音 = Otto Jespersen on Phonetics. Beijing: Commercial Press. pp. 436–470. ISBN 9787100202923 – via University of Southern Denmark.
- Falk, Julia S. (1992). "Otto Jespersen, Leonard Bloomfield, and American structural linguistics". Language. 68 (3): 465–491. doi:10.2307/415791. JSTOR 415791.
- Falk, Julia S. (1995). "Words without grammar: Linguists and the international language movement in the United States". Language and Communication. 15 (3): 241–259. doi:10.1016/0271-5309(95)00010-N.
- Haislund, Niels (1966) [1943]. "Otto Jespersen". In Sebeok, Thomas A. (ed.). Portraits of Linguists: A Biographical Sourcebook for the History of Western Linguistics, 1746–1963: 2, From Eduard Sievers to Benjamin Lee Whorf. Bloomington: Indiana University Press. Reprint of Haislund, Niels (1943). "Otto Jespersen". Englische Studien. 75: 273–282.
- Hjelmslev, Louis (1943). "Otto Jespersen". Acta Linguistica (in French). 3: 119–130. doi:10.1080/03740463.1942.10415397 – via Internet Archive. Reprinted within Hjelmslev, Louis (1973). "Otto Jespersen". Essais linguistiques II (PDF). Travaux du Cercle Linguistique de Copenhague. Vol. 14. Copenhagen: Nordisk Sprog- og Kulturforlag. pp. 41–54. Also reprinted within Haislund, Niels; Hjelmslev, Louis (1966). "Otto Jespersen (1860–1943)". In Sebeok, Thomas A. (ed.). Portraits of Linguists: A Biographical Sourcebook for the History of Western Linguistics, 1746–1963: 2, From Eduard Sievers to Benjamin Lee Whorf. Bloomington: Indiana University Press.
- Hovdhaugen, Even; Karlsson, Fred; Henriksen, Carol; Sigurd, Bengt (2000). The History of Linguistics in the Nordic Countries. Helsinki: Societas Scientiarum Fennica. ISBN 951-653-305-1. (Also preprint.)
- Jespersen, Otto (1894). Progress in Language: With Special Reference to English. London: Swan Sonnenschein. OCLC 607098829 – via Internet Archive.
- Jespersen, Otto (1907). "Mands sprog og kvindes taie" [Man's language and women's speech]. Gads Danske Magasin (in Danish). pp. 581–592.
- Jespersen, Otto (1922). Language: Its Nature, Development, and Origin. London: George Allen & Unwin. OCLC 1523115677 – via Internet Archive.
- Jespersen, Otto (1928). An International Language. London: George Allen & Unwin. OCLC 251023739 – via Hathitrust.
- Jespersen, Otto (1941). Sproget: Barnet, Kvinden, Slægten [Language: Child, woman, family] (in Danish). Copenhagen: Gyldendal. OCLC 247794469.
- Juul, Arne; Nielsen, Hans F., eds. (1989). Otto Jespersen: Facets of His Life and Work. Amsterdam Studies in the Theory and History of Linguistic Science 52. Amsterdam: John Benjamins. ISBN 9789027278357 – via Internet Archive.
  - Christophersen, Paul. "Otto Jespersen". In Juul & Nielsen (1989), pp. 1–11.
  - Francis, W. Nelson. "Otto Jespersen as grammarian". In Juul & Nielsen (1989), pp. 79–99.
  - Larsen, Fritz. "Jespersen's new international auxiliary language". In Juul & Nielsen (1989), pp. 101–122.
  - Nielsen, Hans Frede (1989a). "On Otto Jespersen's view of language evolution". In Juul & Nielsen (1989), pp. 61–78.
  - Nielsen, Jørgen Erik (1989b). "Otto Jespersen and Copenhagen University". In Juul & Nielsen (1989), pp. 13–28.
  - Rischel, Jørgen. "Otto Jespersen's contribution to Danish and general phonetics". In Juul & Nielsen (1989), pp. 43–60.
  - Sørensen, Knud. "The teaching of English in Denmark and Otto Jespersen". In Juul & Nielsen (1989), pp. 29–41.
  - Vejleskov, Hans. "Otto Jespersen's thinking about child language". In Juul & Nielsen (1989), pp. 123–146.
- Kabell, Inge (November 2000). "Jespersen and Franke: An academic friendship by correspondence". Henry Sweet Society for the History of Linguistic Ideas Bulletin. 35 (1): 27–37. doi:10.1080/02674971.2000.11745522.
- McCawley, James D. (1988). The Syntactic Phenomena of English. Chicago: University of Chicago Press. Volume 1: ISBN 0-226-55623-9 and ISBN 0-226-55624-7. Volume 2: ISBN 0-226-55625-5 and ISBN 0-226-55626-3.
- McElvenny, James (September 2017). "Linguistic aesthetics from the nineteenth to the twentieth century: The case of Otto Jespersen's Progress in Language". History of Humanities. 2 (2): 417–442. doi:10.1086/693322. eISSN 2379-3171. ISSN 2379-3163.
- McElvenny, James (2018). Language and Meaning in the Age of Modernism: C. K. Ogden and his Contemporaries. Edinburgh: Edinburgh University Press. ISBN 978-1-4744-2503-2. (Also ISBN 978-1-4744-2504-9 and ISBN 978-1-4744-2505-6.)
- Mufwene, Salikoko S. (2013). "The origins and the evolution of language". In Allan, Keith (ed.). The Oxford Handbook of the History of Linguistics. Oxford: Oxford University Press. pp. 13–52. doi:10.1093/oxfordhb/9780199585847.013.0002. ISBN 978-0-19-958584-7.
- Olsen, Lektor K. V. (May 1947). "English language studies in Denmark". ELT Journal. 1 (6): 157–162. doi:10.1093/elt/1.6.157.
- Thomas, Margaret (2011). Fifty Key Thinkers on Language and Linguistics. Abingdon, Oxfordshire: Routledge. ISBN 978-0-415-37302-9. (Also ISBN 978-0-415-37303-6 and ISBN 978-0-203-81448-2.)
- Thomas, Margaret (2013). "Otto Jespersen and 'The woman', then and now". Historiographia Linguistica. 40 (3): 377–408. doi:10.1075/hl.40.3.03tho. (Postprint also available: Thomas, Margaret (n.d.). "Otto Jespersen and 'The woman', then and now". hdl:2345/bc-ir:107506 – via Boston College University Libraries.)
- van der Wouden, Ton (1997). Negative Contexts: Collocation, Polarity and Multiple Negation. London: Routledge. ISBN 0-415-13849-3.
- Żywiczyński, Przemysław; Wacewicz, Sławomir (2019). The Evolution of Language: Towards Gestural Hypotheses. Dis/continuities: Toruń Studies in Language, Literature and Culture. Berlin: Peter Lang. ISBN 978-3-631-79022-9. (Also ISBN 978-3-631-79393-0.)
