= Junction and nexus =

Two kinds of syntactic relationship

Junction and nexus are two kinds of syntactic relationship, according to the Danish linguist Otto Jespersen, who was keen to demonstrate the parallels as well as the contrast between them. An example of either junction or nexus is described in terms of the rank of each word, or "word group", that makes it up.

== Origin and development ==
Jespersen first wrote of junction and nexus in the book Sprogets Logik (1913), after which his theory of ranks and of nexus versus junction "remained substantially unchanged" but was described more fully in De to Hovedarter av grammattiske Forbindelser (1921), The Philosophy of Grammar (1924), and Analytic Syntax (1937).

== Rank and junction ==
Both nexus and junction involve what Jespersen calls rank. The rank of a word used in a particular context depends on the word's "mutual relations" with other words. As a simple example: (Note: The four chapters of The Philosophy of Grammar that are devoted to rank, nexus and junction use particularly many examples from Modern English, some of which are reproduced in this article. However, Jespersen also provides plenty from elsewhere: chapter 9 ("Various kinds of nexus") also has examples from Arabic, Danish, Old English, Finnish, French, German, Old High German, Gothic, Greek, Italian, Latin, Old Norse, Portuguese, Russian, Sanscrit, Old Slavonic, and Spanish.)

In the combination extremely hot weather the last word weather, which is evidently the chief idea, may be called primary; hot, which defines weather, secondary, and extremely, which defines hot, tertiary.

"Extremely hot weather" is a simple example of what Jespersen terms junction.

In a more complex example, adds Jespersen, a tertiary word might be said to be defined by a quaternary and the quaternary by a quinary; however, "it is needless to distinguish more than three ranks, as there are no formal or other traits that distinguish words of these lower orders from tertiary words".

With examples such as burning hot soup, Jespersen shows that the distinction between secondary (burning taken as coordinated with hot, and related to soup as hot is) and tertiary (burning taken as modifying hot) is not always clear.

=== Rank and part of speech ===
In Jespersen's analysis, a given part of speech (grammatical category) is more or less likely to be employed as a primary, secondary, or tertiary.

- Substantives (Note: Jespersen reserves noun for a class of word in languages such as Finnish that make no formal distinction between (A) words that correspond to the adjectives of English (or Danish, French, etc), and (B) those that correspond to what in the 21st century are called the nouns of English (etc). What we call "nouns", Jespersen instead calls substantives – a term that in the early 20th century was commonly used with this meaning. Substantive, with this sense, is derived from noun substantive, so named in contradistinction to noun adjective. (Their plurals are standardly nouns substantive and nouns adjective.) Bradley (1908), Onions (1919).) are typically primaries, but they are also commonly secondaries and on occasion tertiaries.
- Pronouns – defined so widely as to encompass words such as this (now termed a determinative) – are typically either primaries ("this is mine") or secondaries ("my hat"); they can also be tertiaries ("the more, the merrier"; "none too able").
- Adjectives are typically secondaries; however, in the impossible, the poor, etc, (Note: That is, when they function as what now might be termed fused modifier-heads.) they are primaries; they can also be tertiaries.
- Verbs: "Finite forms of verbs can only stand as secondary words (adnexes), never either as primaries or as tertiaries". But infinitives (often required to be in combination with to) can be primaries ("she wants to rest), adjuncts ("in times to come") and subjuncts ("I shudder to think of it").
- Adverbs (another category that has subsequently changed (Note: Abroad and here are now regarded not as adverbs but as prepositions.)) can be primaries ("he did not stay for long; "he's only just back from abroad"; "from here"), and in some contexts secondaries; but commonly they are tertiaries, modifying adjectives or verbs ("describes accurately", "I firmly believe"; semantically corresponding to "accurate description", "my firm belief", "a firm believer").
- Word groups: With Albert Sechehaye, Jespersen was an innovator in assigning word groups (as he called them) a status independent from that of sentences and predicative structures. Many of these word groups would now be called phrases (in particular, preposition phrases). Word groups can be primaries, secondaries or tertiaries.
- Clauses can be primaries ("What you say is quite true"; "I believe whatever he says"); secondaries ("This is the land where I was born"); and tertiaries ("Whoever said this, it is true"; "It is a custom where I was born").

== Specialization ==
Jespersen uses special to mean what other writers might term specific, and relates the specialization of a word or word group to factors including its part of speech (verb, adjective, etc):

[O]n the whole substantives are more special than adjectives, they are applicable to fewer objects than adjectives. . . . The adjective indicates and singles out one quality, one distinguishing mark, but each substantive suggests, to whoever understands it, many distinguishing features by which he recognizes the person or thing in question.

Other factors are its rank (primary, secondary, etc), and its function within a clause (object, predicative complement, etc):

The subject is always a primary, though not necessarily the only primary in the sentence; this amounts to saying that the subject is comparatively definite and special, while the predicate is less definite, and thus applicable to a greater number of things.

This is a simply demonstrated for sentences such as "My father is old" (old applying to many people or indeed animals, things and more, but my father to a single person); more problematic with the pair "Miss Castlewood was the prettiest girl at the ball" and "The prettiest girl at the ball was Miss Castlewood" (in the specified context, the prettiest girl at the ball and Miss Castlewood being but a single person). As for a clause such as "there were many people present", the generalization about subjects relies on Jespersen's stance that the subject is not there but instead many people. (Note: It would now be called an existential clause, having there as its dummy subject. In The Philosophy of Grammar, Jespersen does not seem to consider what are now termed it-clefts (such as "It was hard to choose").)

Specialization is aided by secondaries. The most important class of adjuncts, writes Jespersen, is of "restrictive or qualifying adjuncts", which limit the reference of the primary, and thus "specialize or define it" ("Icelandic peasants" being more specific than "peasants"). An adjunct is less specific than the primary (and a subjunct less specific than the adjunct), but no matter:

[I]t is really most natural that a less special term is used in order further to specialize what is already to some extent special: the method of attaining a high degree of specialization is analogous to that of reaching the roof of a building by means of ladders: if one ladder will not do, you first take the tallest ladder you have and tie the second tallest to the top of it, and if that is not enough, you tie on the next in length, etc.

A genitive (John's, my) too can be used as a restrictive adjunct.

Jespersen's treatment of articles and the like is not entirely clear. He regards them as pronouns; and says that "the so-called definite article the . . . would be better called the defining or determining article", used as "the least special of adjuncts and yet [one that] specializes more than most other words". He illustrates this: "In the rose, rose is restricted to that one definite rose which is at this very moment in my thought and must be in yours, too, because we have just mentioned it, or because everything in the situation points towards that particular rose." He writes that "the dog is a primary not only when it is the subject, as in the dog barks, but also when it is the object of a verb, as in I see the dog, or of a preposition, as in he runs after the dog" (in which the article belongs to the word group that is a primary); but continues "we may, of course, have two or more coordinate adjuncts to the same primary: thus, in a nice young lady the words a, nice, and young equally define lady", seemingly implying that the article is the entirety of an adjunct.

Proper names too can have adjuncts, and Jespersen distinguishes between the restrictive adjunct in "young Burns" (as distinguished from an older person with that surname) and the non-restrictive adjuncts in "my dear little Ann", which do not specify and "may be termed ornamental . . . or . . . parenthetical adjuncts". The two kinds can be mixed: "In 'this extremely sagacious little man', this alone defines, the other adjuncts merely describe parenthetically" but Jespersen notes that there can be ambiguity: "The industrious Japanese will conquer in the long run: does this mean that the [Japanese] as a nation will conquer, because they are industrious, or that the industrious among the Japanese nation will conquer?"

== Nexus ==
Jespersen compares a furiously barking dog and the dog barks furiously:

The tertiary element furiously is the same in both combinations, and may therefore here be left out of account. The relation between the dog barks and a barking dog is evidently the same as that between the rose is red and a red rose. In the dog barks and the rose is red we have complete meanings, complete sentences, in which it is usual to speak of the dog and the rose as the subject, and of barks and is red as the predicate, while the combination is spoken of as predication. But what is the difference between these and the other combinations?

For Jespersen, the two expressions do differ: whereas the dog barks furiously "is rounded off as a complete piece of communication", the furiously barking dog "lacks that peculiar finish and makes us ask: What about that dog?". Jespersen concedes that the difference is often attributed to the presence or absence of what is called a verb (after participles and infinitives are excluded as mere verbids), but he rejects this as the criterion. Instead, for the constructions exemplified by a furiously barking dog and the dog barks furiously, Jespersen uses junction and nexus respectively.

It will be "useful", Jespersen says, to use adjunct and adnex for a secondary word in a junction and a nexus respectively; and to use subjunct for a tertiary word in either. (Note: He adds that "quaternary words, in the rare cases in which a special name is needed, may be termed sub-subjuncts". For other uses of adjunct and subjunct, see below.)

Jespersen confessed to difficulty in describing the fundamental difference(s) between junction and nexus, and employed imagery for the purpose. The version in The Philosophy of Grammar (1924) is:

A nexus . . . always contains two ideas which must necessarily remain separate: the secondary term adds something new to what has already been named. Whereas the junction is more stiff or rigid, the nexus is more pliable; it is, as it were, animate or articulated. Comparisons, of course, are always to some extent inadequate, still as these things are very hard to express in a completely logical or scientific way, we may be allowed to say that the way in which the adjunct is joined to its primary is like the way in which the nose and the ears are fixed on the head, while an adnex rests on its primary as the head on the trunk or a door on a wall. A junction is like a picture, a nexus like a process or a drama. The distinction between a composite name for one idea and the connexion of one concept with another concept is most easily seen if we contrast two such sentences as the blue dress is the oldest and the oldest dress is blue; the fresh information imparted about the dress is, in the first sentence that it is the oldest, and in the second that it is blue; cf. also a dancing woman charms and a charming woman dances.

In Analytic Syntax (1937), Jespersen revises his comparisons, and concludes:

we get nearer the simple truth by saying that a junction serves to make what we are talking about more definite or precise, while a nexus tells us something by placing two (or more) definite ideas in relation to one another.

== Varieties of nexus ==
Jespersen describes various kinds of nexus.

=== Nexus containing a finite verb ===
Jespersen provides three kinds of nexus containing a finite verb: First, there is the "ordinary complete sentence": the dog barks. Secondly, nexuses can also be found "in subordinate clauses, that is, as parts of a sentence": "She is afraid when the dog barks". And thirdly, there is "the very interesting phenomenon" exemplified in "Arthur whom they say is kill'd to-night". (Note: Jespersen here cites Shakespeare, King John 4.2.165, and comments "The nexus whom is kill'd is the object of they say, whence the use of the accusative whom", referring the reader to the book's appendix, in which, in the face of "[a]ll books on correct English", which "look upon the use of whom in sentences like We feed children whom we think are hungry as a gross or heinous error", he provides a great number of examples by respected authors of this construction and defends its correctness.)

As for alternatives:

I . . . [ask] the reader to bear in mind that on the one hand the presence of a finite verb is not required in a nexus, and that on the other hand a nexus may, but does not always, form a complete sentence.

=== Infinitival nexus ===
First, Jespersen provides examples of "accusative with infinitive": "I heard/made her sing"; "I caused her to sing"; "she can hardly prevail upon him to eat"; "you may count on him to come"; "nothing could be better than for you to call" (in which for you is "nothing but the primary (subject) of the nexus, whose secondary part is the infinitive" But the nexus may be discontinuous: "he is said/expected/supposed to come at five"; and there are "rare cases" of nexuses serving as subjuncts: "we divided it: he to speak to the Spaniards and I to the English". (Note: Quoting Daniel Defoe.)

Although he does not here include gerunds (another verbid, or non-finite verb form), Jespersen does include "verbal substantives" (substantives derived from verbs) such as "I heard of the Doctor's arrival".

=== Nexus without a verb ===
This places "the predicative first, to which the subject is added as a kind of afterthought, but without the verb is". As examples: "Quite serious all this, though it reads like a joke"; "Amazing the things that Russians will gather together and keep". The order may be reversed: "Now I am in Arden, the more fool I!" (Note: Quoting John Ruskin, Horace Walpole and William Shakespeare respectively.)

Jespersen denies that "we have here ellipsis of is" ("quite serious all this is", "the more fool am I", etc), as "it would only weaken the idiomatic force of such sentences if we were to add the verb, though it would be required if the subject were placed first".

In "I doubt the Doctor's cleverness", (Note: Using what Jespersen terms a predicative nexus-word: contrasting with arrival (a verbal nexus-word).) cleverness is derived not from a verb but from an adjective. (Examples such as scholarship and chaplaincy are derived from what Jespersen terms substantives.) Jespersen does concede that "There is evidently great similarity between the substantives here considered, which [such as whiteness] are formed from adjectives, and verbal substantives . . . like coming, arrival, movement, . . . etc."

=== Nexus-object ===
Jespersen regards the cage empty within "I found the cage empty" as a single object: a nexus-object. Other examples: "does that prove me wrong?"; "he gets things done" (Note: These days the cage empty would not be considered to form a constituent; instead, within this example the cage would normally be considered an object and empty an objective (or object-oriented) predicative complement.)

Jespersen comments: "The most interesting thing here is that a verb may take a nexus-object which is quite different from its usual objects, as in 'he drank himself drunk' ... and that verbs otherwise intransitive may have a nexus-object of result: 'he slept himself sober' ".

The object is not necessarily of a verb; a preposition too may have a nexus-object: "I sat at work in the school-room with the window open". Jespersen points out that with is frequent in this construction, and that examples such as with both of us absent show that with has been bleached of its normal meaning.

He adds: "I am inclined to include here some combinations with 'quantifiers', which are not to be taken in the usual way". As examples, too many cooks spoil the broth and no news is good news (which are "evidently quite different from the adjuncts in too many people are poor or no news arrived on that day").

=== Nexus subjuncts ===
The construction is one in which "there are two members standing to another in the peculiar relation here termed nexus", and "this combination plays the part of a subjunct in the sentence". Examples include "we shall go, weather permitting"; "this done, he shut the window"; "dinner over, we left the hotel"

"In this notwithstanding (notwithstanding this) and notwithstanding all our efforts we have properly a nexus-subjunct with this and all our efforts as primaries and the negative participle as adnex, but the construction is now practically to be considered as containing a preposition and its object". (Note: Even when following its object (as in "this notwithstanding"), notwithstanding would now be regarded as a preposition.)

=== Nexus of deprecation ===
"[W]hat might be termed the nexus of deprecation", writes Jespersen, is one "in which the connexion is as it were brushed aside at once as impossible; the meaning is thus negative, and this is expressed in speech by the intonation, which is the same as in questions, often in an exaggerated form and not infrequently given to the two members separately".

This may use an infinitive: "What? I loue! I sue! I seeke a wife!"; "I say anything disrespectful of Dr. Kenn? Heaven forbid!" (Note: Quoting William Shakespeare and George Eliot respectively.)

Or "a subject and a predicative may be placed together with the same interrogative tone and the same effect of brushing aside the idea of their combination as real or possible": "Why, his grandfather was a tradesman! he a gentleman!"

=== Single-member nexus ===
As a nexus must have "two notions" (whereas the members of a junction form one notion), Jespersen supposes that his reader will be surprised to hear of a single-member nexus. However:

We do find cases in which we have either a primary alone or a secondary alone, and which nevertheless offer so close an analogy to an ordinary nexus that it is impossible to separate them from undoubted instances of nexus. But an accurate analysis will show that the usual two members are everywhere present to the mind, and that it is only in the linguistic expression that one of them may now and then be absent.

A primary alone (a nexus without an adnex) appears in "Yes, I made them" (as a response to "Did they run?"), and "I told them to". "Psychologically" writes Jespersen, "these are cases of aposiopesis ('stop-short sentences' or 'pull-up sentences', as I have called them. . . .)"

The reverse (a nexus without a primary) "is extremely frequent in exclamations, where it is not necessary to tell the hearer what one is speaking about; they form complete pieces of communication and should unhesitatingly be termed 'sentences'." Examples include "How nice!"; "What an extraordinary piece of good luck!"; "Practice makes perfect".

"An accusative-with-infinitive without the accusative is not at all rare": "live and let live"; "make believe"; "I have heard say"

The primary of the nexus is unexpressed but understood to be I in "I like to travel", or "I like travelling"; it is understood to be "the indefinite 'generic person' " in "to travel (travelling) is not easy nowadays", or "activity leads to happiness".

== Evaluation and influence ==
The concepts of rank, junction and nexus were essential to Jespersen's syntactic analyses, particularly as described in The Philosophy of Grammar and Analytic Syntax; but also as employed in Essentials of English Grammar and the fourth syntax volume of Modern English Grammar.

Jespersen ends two chapters of The Philosophy of Grammar dedicated to nexus with:

I venture to hope that the reader will find that the numerous phenomena brought together in this and the preceding chapter throw so much light on one another that it warrants my grouping of these constructions in a separate class, for which the term "nexus" may not be found inappropriate.

In his obituary of Jespersen, Louis Helmslev describes the theory of junction and nexus as a well-known part of Jespersen's grammatical doctrine. but one that

in reality is of lesser importance. Theoretically, the distinction between junction and nexus is not clearly defined; the fundamental notions are left undefined, and the consequence of this is an ever-increasing generalization of the notion of nexus. . . . [I]t seems clear that the theory cannot be maintained in this form. (Note: ". . . . en réalité d'une importance moindre. Théoriquement la distinction entre jonction et nexus ne ressort pas d'une façon nette, les notions fondamentales sont laissées sans définition, et la conséquence de ce fait est une généralisation de plus en plus grande de la notion de nexus. . . . [I]l paraît évident que la théorie ne pourra pas être maintenue sous cette forme.")

Pointing out that "[w]e can never assume much correlation between form and meaning", Eugene Nida criticizes Jespersen's "rather serious distortion and complication of the formal and functional values":

For example, the setting up of "nexus" substantives, and dividing expression such as the doctor's arrival from the man's house, because the first is equivalent in meaning to a "nexus" construction, the doctor arrives, is largely unwarranted since there are no paralleling formal or functional differences.

Lorenzo Cigana states that it is difficult to view such straightforward examples of nexus as having secondaries analogous to painted in the painted rose. In the rose is red, the relationship between the secondaries is and red is asymmetrical (red cannot specify is), and "the insertion of a new semantic element that characterizes a verbal construction, ultimately breaks the uniformity of a headed rank-structure". In an old man drank too much wine, it is hard to interpret drank as a secondary of two primaries (man and wine) other than just semantically.

Paul Christophersen remarks that Jespersen's theories of ranks, junction and nexus "have not stood up to later criticism very well". Within a highly laudatory review of Jespersen's Analytic Syntax, (Note: The review concludes by calling the book "a sheer joy to read and an incomparable source of insight into the workings of the English language".) James D. McCawley expresses reservations about the three (which he describes as "peculiarly Jespersenian concepts which appear throughout the book"): "Jespersen's explanations of [these] . . . are far from satisfactory. In [Analytic Syntax], his characterizations of nexus and junction rest heavily on analogies which I find unenlightening. . . ."

Paul Diderichsen's "theory of fields" and Louis Hjelmslev's functional approach both drew from Jespersen's model of syntax.

Impressed by the "simplicity, manageability and versatility" of Jespersen's theoretical approach (according prime importance to rank, junction and nexus) and notation (specifically, those used in Analytic Syntax) , Sigfrido Di Giorgi adopted both for a pedagogic grammar, published in 1994, for intermediate/advanced EFL learners.

== Confusables ==
In Systemic functional grammar, rank has a meaning very different from Jespersen's.

Jespersen's junction and nexus should not be confused with the juncture and nexus of Role and reference grammar.

Both adjunct and (to a lesser extent) subjunct are terms still used in syntactic theory, with meanings related to but very different from those that Jespersen gives them.

== Works cited ==
- Aarts, Bas; Chalker, Sylvia; Weiner, Edmund (2014). Oxford Dictionary of English Grammar (2nd ed.). Oxford: Oxford University Press. ISBN 978-0-19-965823-7.
- Bradley, Henry (1908). "Noun". A New English Dictionary on Historical Principles. Oxford: Oxford University Press – via Internet Archive.
- Cigana, Lorenzo (2020). "Some aspects of dependency in Otto Jespersen's structural syntax". In Imrényi, András; Mazziotta, Nicolas (eds.). Chapters of Dependency Grammar: A Historical Survey from Antiquity to Tesnière. Studies in Language Companion Series 212. Vol. 212. Amsterdam: John Benjamins. doi:10.1075/slcs.212. ISBN 978-90-272-0476-9.
- Crystal, David (2008). A Dictionary of Linguistics and Phonetics (6th ed.). Malden, Massachusetts: Blackwell. pp. 12, 462. ISBN 978-1-4051-5296-9. Also ISBN 978-1-4051-5297-6.
- Di Giorgi, Sigfrido (1994). The Syntactic Structures of English Classified and Explored by Means of Jespersen's Formulas. Turin: Genesi. ISBN 88-86313-10-1 – via Internet Archive.
- Graffi, Giorgio (2001). 200 Years of Syntax: A Critical Survey. Studies in the History of the Language Sciences 98. Vol. 98. Amsterdam: John Benjamins. doi:10.1075/sihols.98. ISBN 90-272-4587-8. (Also ISBN 1-58811-052-4.)
- Huddleston, Rodney; Pullum, Geoffrey K. (2002). The Cambridge Grammar of the English Language. Cambridge: Cambridge University Press. ISBN 978-0-521-43146-0.
- Hjelmslev, Louis (1943). "Otto Jespersen". Obituary. Acta Linguistica (in French). 3: 119–130. doi:10.1080/03740463.1942.10415397 – via Internet Archive.
- Jespersen, Otto (1913). Sprogets Logik [The logic of language] (in Danish). Copenhagen: J. H. Schultz. OCLC 952935015.
- Jespersen, Otto (1921). De to Hovedarter av grammattiske Forbindelser [The two main types of grammatical relations]. Det Kongelige Danske Videnskabernes Selskab: Historisk-filologiske Meddelelser IV, 3 (in Danish). Copenhagen: Andr. Fred. Høst og søn. OCLC 16310596 – via Royal Danish Academy of Sciences and Letters.
- Jespersen, Otto (1924). The Philosophy of Grammar. London: George Allen & Unwin. OCLC 308037 – via Internet Archive.
- Jespersen, Otto (1933). Essentials of English Grammar. London: George Allen & Unwin. OCLC 1593202.
- Jespersen, Otto (1937). Analytic Syntax: A System of Expressing Grammatical Formulae by Symbols. Copenhagen: Levin & Munksgaard. OCLC 1469370.
- Jespersen, Otto (1940). A Modern English Grammar on Historical Principles. Part V. Syntax. Fourth volume. Copenhagen: Ejnar Munksgaard. OCLC 175015576 – via Internet Archive.
- Juul, Arne; Nielsen, Hans F., eds. (1989). Otto Jespersen: Facets of His Life and Work. Amsterdam Studies in the Theory and History of Linguistic Science 52. Amsterdam: John Benjamins. ISBN 9789027278357 – via Internet Archive.
  - Christophersen, Paul. "Otto Jespersen". In Juul & Nielsen (1989), pp. 1–11.
  - Francis, W. Nelson. "Otto Jespersen as grammarian". In Juul & Nielsen (1989), pp. 79–99.
- McCawley, James D. (June 1970). "Review of Jespersen, Analytic Syntax". Book review. Language. 46: 442449. doi:10.2307/412288. JSTOR 412288.
- Nida, Eugene A. (1960) [1943]. Elson, Benjamin (ed.). A Synopsis of English Syntax. Norman, Oklahoma: Summer Institute of Linguistics of the University of Oklahoma. OCLC 896399200.
- Onions, C. T. (1919). "Substantive". A New English Dictionary on Historical Principles. Oxford: Oxford University Press – via Internet Archive.
- Van Valin, R D (2006). "Role and reference grammar". In Brown, Keith (ed.). Encyclopedia of Language and Linguistics. Vol. 10 (2nd ed.). Amsterdam: Elsevier. pp. 641–650. ISBN 0-08-044299-4.
