= Reinard Zandvoort =

Dutch professor

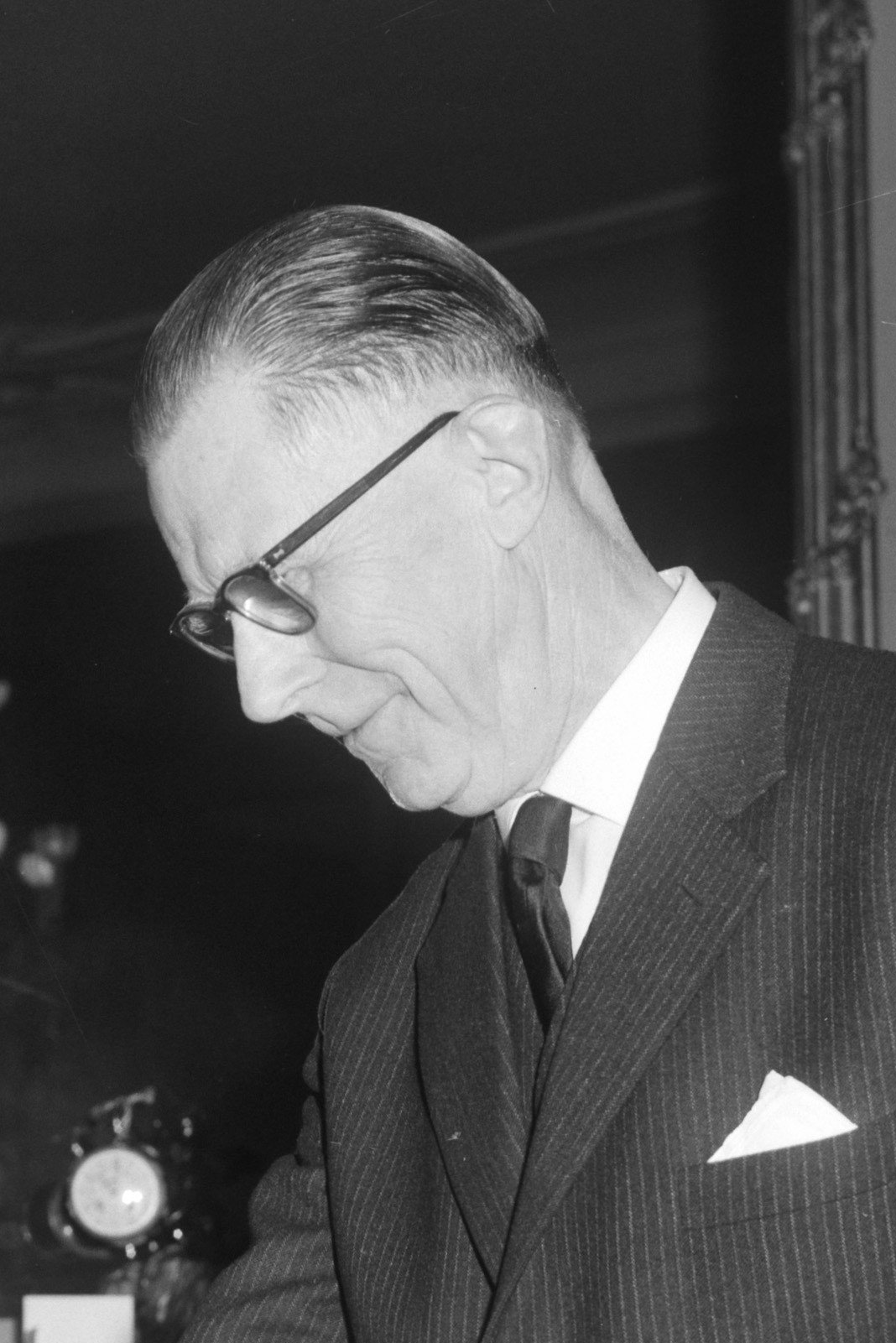
- Zandvoort in 1963
- Born: July 2, 1894; Avenhorn
- Died: 7 August 1990 (aged 96); Amersfoort
- Occupations: Professor of English Literature and Language

Academic background
- Education: Leiden University

Reinard Willem Zandvoort (July 2, 1894 – August 7, 1990) was a Dutch professor. He taught English at the University of Groningen. He received honorary doctorates from several universities, and was a Commander in the Order of the British Empire and a Knight in the Order of the Netherlands Lion.

== Biography and career ==
Zandvoort was born in Avenhorn on July 2, 1894. He studied English at the University of Amsterdam and the University of Groningen and was an assistant teacher in Maidenhead from 1914 to 1916. He taught at the Nijmegen municipal school from 1919 until 1930, and then at the municipal school in The Hague from 1930until 1937.

In 1929, Zandvoort received his PhD cum laude from Leiden University. For the dissertation, Zandvoort compared the two versions, "old" and "new", of Philip Sidney's pastoral work Arcadia (the "old" had first been published as recently as 1926). The dissertation was published in 1929 as Sidney's "Arcadia": A Comparison between the Two Versions. With its "extensive side-by-side comparisons", this work made Zandvoort "The first – really the only – scholar to concern himself with the style of the Old Arcadia".

Zandvoort was appointed a tutor for English philology at Leiden University in 1936, and the following year professor of English Literature and Language at the University of Groningen, where he taught "Old and Middle English, Modern English, and English Literature up to and including Shakespeare".

In 1919, Zandvoort founded the journal English Studies. A year later, he invited Etsko Kruisinga to become coeditor. Their professional relationship was contentious; and in 1931, after Kruisinga attempted to oust Zandvoort, the publisher dismissed Kruisinga and Zandvoort again became sole editor. He continued as editor until 1969; and for the following two decades remained involved in the journal, prefacing the December 1989 issue with a "Retrospect".

After teaching for a quarter century, Zandvoort published his Handbook of English Grammar, intended for Dutch students, in 1945. In contrast to Hendrik Poutsma's Grammar of Late Modern English and Kruisinga's Handbook of Present Day English (both of them multivolume works), Zandvoort's Handbook is a "clear and student-friendly" single-volume summary of the content of Johan Storm's Englische Philologie, Otto Jespersen's Modern English Grammar, and Poutsma's Grammar of Late Modern English. It makes no theoretical claims or advances. A French edition appeared in 1949. From 1957, Longmans published editions all in English for an international readership. Japanese and American editions also appeared.

Flor Aarts (Note: "F.G.A.M. Aarts" and "Flor Aarts" refer to the same person, the linguist Florent Gérard Antoine Marie Aarts (1934–2021).) said in 1986 that "If Holland still enjoys a reputation in English studies, it is largely due to [F.Th.] Visser's monumental Historical Syntax of the English Language and to Zandvoort's Handbook of English Grammar"; adding that "for almost thirty years [the Handbook] maintained its position as the only useful pedagogical grammar of English that was available in The Netherlands"; eventually toppled by Randolph Quirk's Grammar of Contemporary English (1972) and other books cowritten by Quirk. But Handbook had been old-fashioned even when its international edition was first published in 1957. Its failings had included a "notional approach to linguistic analysis, that is, for adopting meaning as the basis for grammatical classification". Zandvoort writes that "The word (or words) indicating the person or thing referred to is (are) called the subject of the sentence"; Aarts points out that this would lead to the conclusion that "in Zandvoort's example There was no wind the subject is no wind rather than there, since it is obviously impossible to make assertions about non-referential words like there." (Note: The dummy pronoun there is the subject of the existential sentence There is no wind; as shown by its inversion with the verb in both the interrogative Is there no wind? and the tag question There is no wind, is there?)

However, Aarts concludes that:

it is possible to [describe the inadequacy of Handbook] without detracting from Zandvoort's achievements. In the post-war history of the teaching of English at university level his grammar played such a crucial role, both nationally and internationally, that it deserves a permanent place in "The Great Tradition" of English grammars

Pointing out in 1991 that "The major change that has [occurred since the advent of structuralism] in the history of traditional grammars of English is the change from word-based descriptions that also take account of larger structures" (particularly phrases), Flor Aarts shows that the treatment of noun phrases in Zandvoort's Handbook is utterly inadequate, and that in either Randolph Quirk et al.'s A Comprehensive Grammar of the English Language (1985) or Rodney Huddleston's Introduction to the Grammar of English (1984) is far superior.

Zandvoort keenly supported international co-operation, and was Organising Secretary of the first two conferences (Oxford, 1950; Paris, 1953) of the International Association of University Professors of English. He was the first president (from 1954) of the European Association for American Studies; and from 1954 to 1957 he presided over the Fédération Internationale des Langues et Littératures Modernes.

He retired from the University of Groningen in 1964.

Zandvoort married Anna Elisabeth Ritman in 1921. The couple had three children, two of whom died from illness in 1930. Zandvoort died in Amersfoort on August 7, 1990.

== Books by Zandvoort ==
The list below is selective. (Note: See also "A list of the published writings of Professor R. W. Zandvoort" (1964), which ends: "Several hundred reviews, none of them listed here, have appeared in", followed by a list of 13 periodicals.)

- Sidney's "Arcadia": A comparison between the two versions. Amsterdam: Swets & Zeitlinger, 1929. OCLC 1404599358. (And later editions.) 1929 edition via the Internet Archive.
- Engelse Spraakkunst voor Gymnasia (with P.J.H.O. Schut). Groningen: J.B. Wolters, 1935. OCLC 65567798. (And later editions.)
- A handbook of English grammar. Groningen: Wolters, 1945. (And later editions.) Seventh edition (Longman, 1975) via the Internet Archive.
- Collected papers: A selection of notes and articles originally published in "English Studies" and other journals. Volume 1. Groningen: J.B. Wolters, 1954. OCLC 5934832.
- Collected papers II: Articles in English published between 1955 and 1970. Groningen: Wolters-Noordhoff, 1970. ISBN 9789001354077.
- Wartime English: Materials for a linguistic history of World War II. Groningen Studies in English. Groningen: Wolters, 1957. OCLC 469034955.
- English in the Netherlands: A study in linguistic infiltration. Groningen Studies in English. Groningen: J.B. Wolters, Groningen, 1964. OCLC 3137958.
