= George Oliver Curme =

American linguist

George Oliver Curme Sr. (January 14, 1860, in Richmond, Indiana – April 29, 1948) was an American grammarian and philologist. He is known for writing Grammar of the German Language (1905, revised 1922), and A Grammar of the English Language (1931).
