= Hans Marchand =

German linguist (1907–1978)

Hans Marchand (Krefeld, 1 October 1907 – Genoa, 13 December 1978) was a German linguist. He studied Romance languages, English and Latin, and after fleeing Germany in 1934 was a lecturer of linguistics at Istanbul, Yale University, and Bard College. From 1957 to 1973 he was a professor at the University of Tübingen.

Marchand published works on linguistic phenomena occurring in languages such as English, French, Turkish and Italian, but became famous in his discipline for his theories on word-formation in the English language. Linguists following his approach are called Marchandeans.

Marchand wrote much of what would become The Categories and Types of Present-Day English Word-Formation (1960) "while in internal exile in Turkey in an Anatolian village from 1944 to 1945, under threat of repatriation to Germany". Decades after the publication in 1969 of the second, greatly expanded (and much more widely cited) edition, it was still being cited approvingly in the morphology literature: "has remained the authoritative description of English word-formation", a "meticulous volume", a "milestone monograph", a "monumental volume . . . likely to continue to be widely used as a reference book".

== Publications ==
- The Categories and Types of Present-Day English Word-Formation. A Synchronic-Diachronic Approach. Wiesbaden: Harrassowitz, 1960. At the Internet Archive.
  - 2nd edition, Handbücher das Studium der Anglistik. Munich: C. H. Beck, 1969. At the Internet Archive.
