= Arthur van Essen =

Dutch linguist

Arthur Joseph van Essen (born 13 May 1938, Rotterdam) is a Dutch linguist, academic and author.

== Career ==
Van Essen received his BA teaching certificate in Modern English in 1962, and his MA in English Language and Literature in 1968. He received his BA in English Language and Literature in 1974 and an MA in General Linguistics in 1977 from the University of Leiden. He completed a PhD in General Linguistics in 1983 from the University of Utrecht.
