= Fred Karlsson =

Linguistics professor at the University of Helsinki (born 1946)

Professor emeritus Fred Karlsson
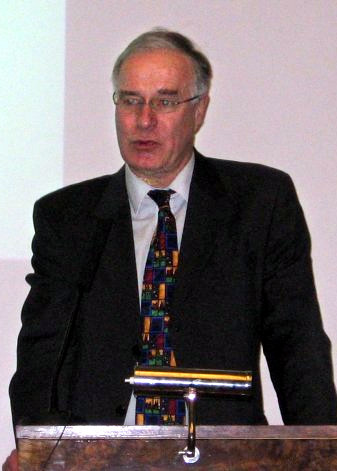
- Karlsson in 2007.
- Born: February 17, 1946 (age 80); Turku, Finland

Academic background
- Education: Åbo Akademi (1969); University of Turku (1969 & 1974); University of Chicago (1972)
- Website: http://www.ling.helsinki.fi/~fkarlsso/

Fred Göran Karlsson (born February 17, 1946, in Turku) is a professor emeritus of general linguistics at the University of Helsinki.

== Education and background ==
Karlsson's father Göran Karlsson was a prominent linguist and worked as a professor of Finnish Language and Literature at Åbo Akademi.

Fred Karlsson studied Finnish language at Åbo Akademi and phonetics at the University of Turku, and graduated in 1969. In 1972 he graduated in linguistics at the University of Chicago.

Karlsson earned his Ph.D. in phonetics at the University of Turku in 1974.

== Academic career ==
In computational linguistics Karlsson has designed a language-independent formalism called Constraint Grammar. It makes possible the automatic morphological disambiguation and syntactic analysis of ordinary running text that has been supplied with all theoretically possible morphological and syntactic interpretations. The basic original reference is Karlsson (1990) which defines Constraint Grammar.

Karlsson has also worked on the history of linguistics, where his main contribution is participation in a book by Even Hovdhaugen, Fred Karlsson, Carol Henriksen, and Bengt Sigurd, The History of Linguistics in the Nordic Countries, Societas Scientiarum Fennica, Jyväskylä 2000.

Although Karlsson is a Swedish-speaking Finn, his knowledge of his second native language Finnish is exceptionally good, and he is widely considered a de facto authority on the language's rules. His work on the language (e.g. Finnish: An Essential Grammar, Karlsson (2004), originally published in 1983 and republished in 1999) has been used in various Finnish translations of open source projects.
