= Paul Diderichsen =

Danish linguist (1905–1964)

Paul Diderichsen (16 August 1905, Copenhagen – 9 October 1964, Copenhagen) was a Danish linguist who is known for his model of sentence structure in Danish which has been widely applied to describe the syntax of languages with fixed word order, such as the mainland Scandinavian languages. Diderichsen was professor of Danish at the University of Copenhagen from 1943 until his death.

== The Diderichsen Sentence Model ==
In order to describe the different operations in Danish syntax, Diderichsen developed a model, making use of ordered slots into which different sentence constituents can be inserted. Danish is a so-called V2 language, a language in which the verb is nearly always the second constituent in a wellformed clause, the preverbal slot can be used to insert many different kinds of syntactic elements.

The basic model distinguishes a grounding field, a nexus field and a content field. The grounding field contains elements that are moved out of one of the other slots in order to serve as the theme of the sentence. The nexus field contains slots for the finite verb and its arguments and adverbial modifiers. The content field contains the infinite verb, its object and adverbial modifiers.
