= Hans Frede Nielsen =

Danish philologist (1943–2021)

- Born: 20 May 1943; Bramming, Denmark
- Died: 9 January 2021 (aged 77)

Academic background
- Education: University of Copenhagen; Cambridge University; Odense University
- Academic advisor: Dennis Howard Green

Academic work
- Discipline: Philology
- Sub-discipline: Germanic philology
- Institutions: University of Southern Denmark
- Main interests: Germanic languages; Runology

Hans Frede Nielsen (20 May 1943 – 9 January 2021) was a Danish philologist who was Professor Emeritus of Historical Linguistics at the University of Southern Denmark. He specialized in Germanic linguistics and runology.

== Biography ==
Hans Frede Nielsen was born in Bramming, Denmark, on 20. May 1943, the son of Frede Nielsen and Sonja Nielsen. Nielsen studied English and German at the University of Copenhagen from 1963 to 1966. He received a Trinity College Foreign Bursary, which enabled him to earn a BA (1968) and MA in Anglo-Saxon Studies at Cambridge University. Among his teachers at Cambridge were Dennis Howard Green.

Returning to Denmark, Nielsen worked as a high school teacher for several years. From 1975, Nielsen lectured at the Institute for English at Odense University. He received his PhD in November 1980 with the thesis Old English and the Continental Germanic languages, which has subsequently been published in several editions. In 1999, Nielsen was appointed Professor of Historical Linguistics at the University of Southern Denmark. He retired as Professor Emeritus in September 2006, but continued to teach and research until his death in 2021.

Nielsen was a Member of the Fryske Akademy (1996). He was a co-founder and co-editor of the journal NOWELE, published by John Benjamins Publishing Company.

== Selected works ==
- Old English and the Continental Germanic languages, 1981
- The Germanic languages, 1989
- The Early Runic Language of Scandinavia, 2000

== See also ==
- Winfred P. Lehmann
- Jay Jasanoff

== Sources ==
- "Hans Frede Nielsen, Odense C, fylder 70 år". Fyens Stiftstidende (in Danish). 3 May 2017.
- "Interview med Hans Frede Nielsen" (PDF). University of Southern Denmark (in Danish). 15 November 2016.
