= History of English grammars =

The history of English grammars begins late in the sixteenth century with the Pamphlet for Grammar by William Bullokar. In the early works, the structure and rules of English grammar were based on those of Latin. A more modern approach, incorporating phonology, was introduced in the nineteenth century.

== Sixteenth to eighteenth centuries ==
The first English grammar, Pamphlet for Grammar by William Bullokar, written with the seeming goal of demonstrating that English was quite as rule-bound as Latin, was published in 1586. Bullokar's grammar was faithfully modelled on William Lily's Latin grammar, Rudimenta Grammatices (1534). Lily's grammar was being used in schools in England at the time, having been "prescribed" for them in 1542 by Henry VIII. Although Bullokar wrote his grammar in English and used a "reformed spelling system" of his own invention, many English grammars, for much of the century after Bullokar's effort, were to be written in Latin; this was especially the case for books whose authors were aiming to be scholarly. Christopher Cooper's Grammatica Linguæ Anglicanæ (1685) was the last English grammar written in Latin.

Latin grammar traditions bore down oppressively on early English grammar writing. Any attempt by one author to assert an independent grammatical rule for English was quickly followed by declarations by others of the truth of the corresponding Latin-based equivalent. As late as the early nineteenth century, Lindley Murray, the author of a widely used grammar, was having to cite "grammatical authorities" to bolster the claim that grammatical cases in English are different from the ones in Ancient Greek or Latin.

The focus on tradition belied the role that other social forces had begun to play in the early seventeenth century. Increasing commerce, and the social changes in its wake, created a new impetus for grammar writing. The greater British role in international trade in the second half of the century created a demand for English grammars among speakers of other languages. Quite a few English grammars were published in European languages.

In Britain, as education and literacy spread in the early eighteenth century, many grammars, such as the several editions of John Brightland's Grammar of the English Tongue and James Greenwood's Essay towards a Practical English Grammar, were written for "non-learned, native-speaker audiences" who did not know the rudiments of Latin. These audiences included women (the "fair sex"), apprentices, merchants, tradesmen, and children.

If by the end of the seventeenth century, English grammar writing had made a modest start, totaling 16 grammars from the time of Bullokar's Pamphlet, by the end of the eighteenth century, a brisk pace had been set with some 270 titles added, though it was less than half that number if later editions were not included; a large proportion were published late in the century, Both publishing and demand were to continue to mushroom. The first half of the nineteenth century would see the appearance of almost 900 new English grammar books. Showing little originality, most took the tack of claiming—as justification for their appearance—that the needs of their particular target audience were still unmet or that a particular "grammatical point" had not been adequately treated in the preexisting texts, or oftentimes both. Texts that aimed to be utilitarian and egalitarian were proliferating. Edward Shelley's The People's Grammar; or English Grammar Without Difficulties for 'the Million' (1848), for example, was written for "the mechanic and hard-working youth, in their solitary struggles for the acquirement of knowledge." William Cobbett's popular mid-century book was titled A Grammar of the English Language, in a Series of Letters: Intended for the Use of Schools and of Young Persons in General, but more especially for the use of Soldiers, Sailors, Apprentices, and Plough-Boys. Ann Fisher published an English grammar in 1745 and some 30 editions after that, making it one of the most popular early English grammars and the first written by a woman.

== Eighteenth-century prescriptive grammars ==
The 18th century saw the emergence of prescriptive grammars in English. A prescriptive grammar refers to a set of norms or rules governing how a language should or should not be used rather than describing the ways in which a language is actually used.

Ann Fisher published 'A New Grammar' in 1745 which was among the earliest in the 18th century.

Robert Lowth, published A Short Introduction to English Grammar, with critical notes (1762), his only work on the subject.

In America in 1765, the Rev. Dr. Samuel Johnson, founder and first president of King's College in New York City (now Columbia University) published An English Grammar; the First Easy Rudiments of Grammar Applied to the English Tongue. It "appears to have been the first English grammar prepared by an American and published in America." In 1767, Johnson combined his grammar with a Hebrew grammar, and published it as An English and Hebrew grammar, being the first short rudiments of those two languages, suggesting the languages be taught together to children. Johnson developed his grammars independently of Lowth, but later corresponded and exchanged grammars with him. English grammar increasingly held great significance for people in the United States with little to no income, and educational backgrounds. Learning the basic principles of grammar helped a cross-section ranging from former slaves to rail splitters and weavers to speak and write with fluency and rise in their careers.

In Britain, the women Ellin Devis, Dorothea Du Bois, Mrs. M. C. Edwards, Mrs. Eves, Ellenor Fenn (aka Mrs. Teachwell and Mrs. Lovechild), Jane Gardiner née Arden, Blanche Mercy, and Mrs. Taylor, published some twelve grammars in the late 18th-century, their books running into many editions over several decades. English grammar was being seen to be important not only for better English writing but also for learning other languages thereafter.

== Nineteenth century to present ==
Modern-language studies became systematized during the nineteenth century. In the case of English, this happened first in continental Europe, where it was studied by historical and comparative linguists. In 1832, Danish philologist Rasmus Rask published an English grammar, Engelsk Formlære, part of his extensive comparative studies in the grammars of Indo-European languages. German philologist Jacob Grimm, the elder of the Brothers Grimm, included English grammar in his monumental grammar of Germanic languages, Deutsche Grammatik (1822–1837). German historical linguist Eduard Adolf Maetzner published his 1,700 page Englische Grammatik between 1860 and 1865; an English translation, An English grammar: methodical, analytical and historical appeared in 1874. Contributing little new to the intrinsic scientific study of English grammar, these works nonetheless showed that English was being studied seriously by the first professional linguists.

As phonology became a full-fledged field, spoken English began to be studied scientifically as well, generating by the end of the nineteenth century an international enterprise investigating the structure of the language. This enterprise comprised scholars at various universities, their students who were training to be teachers of English, and journals publishing new research. All the pieces were in place for new "large-scale English grammars" which combined the disparate approaches of the previous decades. The first work to lay claim to the new scholarship was British linguist Henry Sweet's A new English grammar: logical and historical, published in two parts, Phonology and Accidence (1892) and Syntax (1896), its title suggesting not only continuity and contrast with Maetzner's earlier work, but also kinship with the contemporary A New English Dictionary on Historical Principles (begun 1884), later the Oxford English Dictionary (1895). Two other contemporary English grammars were also influential. English Grammar: Past and Present, by John Collinson Nesfield, was originally written for the market in colonial India. It was later expanded to appeal to students in Britain as well, from young men preparing for various professional examinations to students in "Ladies' Colleges." Other books by Nesfield include A Junior Course In English Composition, A Senior Course In English Composition, but it was his A Manual Of English Grammar and Composition that proved to be greatly successful both in Britain and her colonies—so much so that it formed the basis for many other grammar and composition primers including but not limited to Warriner's English Grammar and Composition and High School English Grammar and Composition, casually called Wren & Martin, authored by P. C. Wren and H. Martin. Grammar of spoken English (1924), by H. E. Palmer, written for the teaching and study of English as a foreign language, included a full description of the intonation patterns of English.

The next set of wide-ranging English grammars were written by Danish and Dutch linguists. Danish linguist Otto Jespersen, who had coauthored a few books with Henry Sweet, began work on his seven-volume Modern English grammar on historical principles in the first decade of the twentieth century. The first volume, Sounds and Spellings, was published in 1909; it then took forty years for the remaining volumes on syntax (volumes 2 through 5), morphology (volume 6), and syntax again (volume 7), to be completed. Jespersen's original contribution was in analyzing the various parts of a sentence in terms of categories that he named, rank, junction, and nexus, forgoing the usual word classes. His ideas would inspire the later work of Noam Chomsky and Randolph Quirk.

The Dutch tradition of writing English grammars, which began with Thomas Basson's The Conjugations in Englische and Netherdutche in the same year—1586—as William Bullokar's first English grammar (written in English), gained renewed strength in the early 20th century in the work of three grammarians: Hendrik Poutsma, Etsko Kruisinga, and Reinard Zandvoort. Poutsma's Grammar of late modern English, published between 1904 and 1929 and written for "continental, especially Dutch students," selected all its examples from English literature.

== Timeline of important English grammars ==
- 1551. John Hart The Opening of the Unreasonable Writing of our Inglish Toung
- 1586. William Bullokar: Brief Grammar of English.
- 1594. Paul Greaves: Grammatica Anglicana.
- 1612. Thomas Tomkis De Analogia Anglicani Sermoni liber Grammaticus, Royal Manuscript Collection of the British Library (12.F.xviii).
- 1617. Alexander Hume: Orthographie and Congruitie of the Britan Tongue.
- 1619/1621. Alexander Gill: Logonomia Anglica.
- 1634. Charles Butler: English Grammar.
- 1640. Ben Jonson: The English Grammar.
- 1646. Joshua Poole: The English Accidence.
- 1653. John Wallis: Grammatica Linguæ Anglicanæ.
- 1654. Jeremiah Wharton: The English Grammar.
- 1662. James Howell: A New English Grammar.
- 1669. John Newton: School Pastime for Young Children: or the Rudiments of Grammar.
- 1671. Thomas Lye: The Child's Delight.
- 1685. Christopher Cooper: Grammatica Linguæ Anglicanæ.
- 1688. Guy Miège: The English Grammar.
- 1693. Joseph Aickin: The English grammar.
- 1700. A. Lane: A Key to the Art of Letters.
- 1745. Ann Fisher A New Grammar.
- 1761. Joseph Priestley: The Rudiments of English Grammar:Adapted to the Use of Schools.
- 1762. Robert Lowth: A short introduction to English grammar: with critical notes.
- 1763. John Ash: Grammatical institutes: or, An easy introduction to Dr. Lowth's English grammar.
- 1765. William Ward: An Essay on English Grammar.
- 1766. Samuel Johnson: A dictionary of the English Language...: to which is prefixed, a Grammar of the English Language.
- 1772. Joseph Priestley: The Rudiments of English Grammar: Adapted to the Use of Schools.
- 1775. Ellin Devis: The Accidence
- 1772. Dorothea Du Bois: Short English Grammar
- 1795. Lindley Murray: English grammar: adapted to the different classes of learners.
- 1799. Jane Gardiner: Young Ladies’ Grammar
- 1804. Noah Webster: A Grammatical Institute of the English Language.
- 1809. William Hazlitt: A New and Improved Grammar of the English Tongue
- 1818. William Cobbett: A Grammar of the English Language, In a Series of Letters.
- 1850. William Chauncey Fowler: English grammar: The English language in its elements and forms.
- 1874. Eduard Adolf Maetzner, An English grammar: methodical, analytical, and historical. With a treatise on the orthography, prosody, inflections and syntax of the English tongue, and numerous authorities cited in order of historical development. (English translation of Englische Grammatik (1860–65)).
- 1892/98. Henry Sweet: A New English Grammar, Logical and Historical (Part 1: Introduction, Phonology, and Accidence; Part 2: Syntax).
- 1898. John Nesfield. A Manual of English Grammar and Composition.
- 1904–1929. Hendrik Poutsma: A Grammar of Modern English (5 volumes).
- 1909–1932. Etsko Kruisinga: A Handbook of Present-day English.
- 1909–1949. Otto Jespersen: A Modern English Grammar on Historical Principles.
- 1931/1935. George O. Curme: A Grammar of the English Language.
- 1945. R. W. Zandvoort: A Handbook of English Grammar.
- 1952. Charles C. Fries: The Structure of English: An Introduction to the Construction of English Sentences.
- 1984. M. A. K. Halliday: An Introduction to Functional Grammar.
- 1985. Randolph Quirk, Sidney Greenbaum, Geoffrey Leech, and Jan Svartvik: A Comprehensive Grammar of the English Language.
- 1996. Sidney Greenbaum, Oxford English Grammar. 652 pages.
- 1999. Douglas Biber, Stig Johansson, Geoffrey Leech, Susan Conrad, and Edward Finegan: Longman Grammar of Spoken and Written English.
- 2002. Rodney Huddleston and Geoffrey Pullum: The Cambridge Grammar of the English Language. 1842 pages.
- 2006. Ronald Carter and Michael McCarthy: Cambridge Grammar of English: A Comprehensive Guide. 973 pages.
- 2011. Bas Aarts: Oxford Modern English Grammar. 410 pages.

== See also ==
- English grammar

== Sources ==
- Ash, John (1810) [1763], Grammatical institutes: or, An easy introduction to Dr. Lowth's English grammar
- Biber, Douglas; Johansson, Stig; Leech, Geoffrey; Conrad, Susan; Finegan, Edward (1999), Longman grammar of spoken and written English, Harlow: Pearson Education, ISBN 0-582-23725-4. 1203 pages.
- Bullokar, William (1586a), Bref Grammar for English, London: Edmund Bollifant
- Bullokar, William (1586b), William Bullokarz Pamphlet for Grammar, London: Edmund Bollifant
- Carter, Ronald; McCarthy, Michael (2006), Cambridge Grammar of English: A Comprehensive Guide, Cambridge: Cambridge University Press, ISBN 0-521-58846-4. 973 pages.
- Cobbett, William (1883) [1818], A Grammar of the English Language, In a Series of Letters: Intended for the Use of Schools and of Young Persons in General, but more especially for the use of Soldiers, Sailors, Apprentices, and Plough-Boys, New York: A. S. Barnes
- Curme, George O. (1931), A Grammar of the English Language, Volume 3: Syntax, Boston: D. C. Heath
- Curme, George O. (1935), A Grammar of the English Language, Volume 2: Parts of Speech and Accidence, Boston: D. C. Heath
- Dons, Ute (2004), Descriptive adequacy of early modern English grammars, Berlin: Walter de Gruyter, ISBN 3-11-018193-2
- Fowler, William Chauncey (1881) [1850], English grammar: The English language in its elements and forms. With a history of its origin and development. Designed for use in colleges and schools, New York: Harper & Brothers
- Fries, Charles Carpenter (1952), The Structure of English: An Introduction to the Construction of English Sentences, New York: Harcourt, Brace
- Halliday, M. A. K. (1984), Introduction to Functional Grammar, Cambridge, Massachusetts: Harvard University Press, ISBN 0-674-46120-7
- Hodson, Jane (2008), "Joseph Priestley's two Rudiments of English Grammar: 1761 and 1768", in Tieken-Boon van Ostade, Ingrid (ed.), Grammars, Grammarians and Grammar-Writing in Eighteenth-Century England, Topics in English Linguistics 59, Berlin: Mouton De Gruyter, pp. 177–190, doi:10.1515/9783110199185.3.177, ISBN 978-3-11-019627-6
- Huddleston, Rodney D.; Pullum, Geoffrey K., eds. (2002). The Cambridge grammar of the English language. Cambridge: Cambridge University Press. ISBN 0-521-43146-8.. 1860 pages.
- Jespersen, Otto (1909–1940), A modern English grammar on historical principles (volumes 1–7), Heidelberg: C. Winter
- Jonson, Ben (1756) [1640], "The English grammar: Made by Ben Jonson for the benefit of all strangers, out of his observation of the English language now spoken and in use", The Works of Ben Jonson: Volume 7, London: D. Midwinter et al
- Johnson, Samuel (1766), A dictionary of the English Language...: to which is prefixed, a Grammar of the English Language, London: A. Millar et al
- Kruisinga, Etsko (1909–1932), A Handbook of Present-day English, Utrecht: Kemink en zoon. Four volumes.
- Lily, William (1709), A Short Introduction of Grammar Generally to be Used: Compiled and Set Forth for the Bringing Up of All Those that Intend to Attain to the Knowledge of the Latin Tongue. To which are Added Usefull Observations by Way of Comment Out of Ancient and Late Grammarians, Oxford: Oxford University Press
- Linn, Andrew (2008), "English grammar writing", in Aarts, Bas; McMahon, April (eds.), Handbook of English Linguistics, Wiley-Blackwell, pp. 72–92, ISBN 978-1-4051-8787-9
- Fisher, Ann (1750) [1745], A New Grammar of the English Language with Exercises of Bad English, Newcastle: I. Thompson
- Lowth, Robert (1775) [1762], A short introduction to English grammar: with critical notes, London: J. Dodsley and T. Cadell
- Maetzner, Eduard Adolf Ferdinand; Grece, Clair James (1874a), An English grammar: methodical, analytical, and historical. With a treatise on the orthography, prosody, inflections and syntax of the English tongue, and numerous authorities cited in order of historical development. Volume I, London: J. Murray. Also published in Boston by Robert Brothers.
- Maetzner, Eduard Adolf Ferdinand; Grece, Clair James (1874c), An English grammar: methodical, analytical, and historical. With a treatise on the orthography, prosody, inflections and syntax of the English tongue, and numerous authorities cited in order of historical development. Volume III, London: J. Murray. Also published in Boston by Robert Brothers.
- Murray, Lindley (1809) [1795], English grammar: adapted to the different classes of learners (17th ed.), Philadelphia: Benjamin Johnson et al. Pp. 308
- Murray, Lindley (1838) [1797], Abridgment of Murray's English Grammar: With an Appendix, Containing Exercises in Orthography, in Parsing, in Syntax, and in Punctuation: Designed for the Younger Classes of Learners, Philadelphia: J. and W. Paul
- Poutsma, Hendrik (1904–1929), A Grammar of Modern English: for the use of continental, especially Dutch, students, Groningen: P. Noordhoff
- Priestley, Joseph (1772), The Rudiments of English Grammar: Adapted to the Use of Schools, London: J. and F. Rivington, T. Lowndes, S. Crowder, T. Becket, and J. Johnson. 202 pages.
- Quirk, Randolph; Greenbaum, Sidney; Leech, Geoffrey; Svartvik, Jan (1985), A comprehensive grammar of the English language, Harlow: Longman, ISBN 0-582-51734-6. 1779 pages.
- Sweet, Henry (1900) [1892], A New English Grammar, Logical and Historical, Part 1, Introduction, Phonology, and Accidence, Oxford: Clarendon Press
- Sweet, Henry (1898), A New English Grammar, Logical and Historical, Part 2, Syntax, Oxford: Clarendon Press
- Ward, William (1765), An essay on grammar as it may be applied to the English language, London: Horsfield
- Ward, William (1767), A grammar of the English language, in two treatises: The first, containing rules for every part of its construction, The second, shewing the nature of the several parts of speech, York: A. Ward, for C. Etherington. 271 pages.
- Webster, Noah (1804), A grammatical institute of the English language: comprising an easy, concise, and systematic method of education designed for the use of English schools in America. Part second, containing a plain and comprehensive grammar grounded on the true principles and idioms of the language, New York: E. Duyckinck. 116 pages.
- Webster, Noah (1822), A Philosophical and Practical Grammar of the English Language, New Haven: Howe & Spalding. 223 pages.
- Zandvoort, Reinard Willem (1945), A handbook of English grammar, Groningen: Wolters-Noordhoff, ISBN 9780582553200. 349 pages.
