= Comprised of =

Controversial English phrase

Comprised of is an expression in English that means "which consists of". For instance, one might say that "A string quartet is comprised of two violinists, a violist, and a cellist". The phrase is notable for being the subject of a usage controversy because the word "comprise", when used on its own as an active verb, traditionally assigns the opposite thematic roles. For instance, one can say that "A string quartet comprises two violinists, a violist, and a cellist". As a result, some prescriptivists object to the phrase, viewing it as an erosion of the distinction between "compose" and "comprise".

The usage controversy has been ongoing since the mid-20th century. Objections to the phrase have been severely criticized by linguists including Mark Liberman, who notes examples of its use by highly regarded writers dating back to the 1700s. The phrase was added to the Oxford English Dictionary in 1874 and is generally regarded as standard by dictionaries and style guides, though some (including Merriam-Webster OnLine) observe that its use may invite criticism from language purists.

One Wikipedia editor's efforts to remove every occurrence of "comprised of" from Wikipedia received widespread media coverage in 2015.

== Use ==
The phrase comprised of has been in use in its current meaning since the early 18th century, (Note: With what is likely to have been a different meaning, it goes back to 1661 if not earlier. Russinoff, David; Liberman, Mark; et al. (6 June 2011). "More on the history of comprised of meaning 'composed of'". Language Log.) and has been used by major novelists, intellectuals, and essayists.

Some examples (emphasis added):

- "For so tho' a Triangle in the most simple and precise Conception of it be only a Figure comprised of three right Lines, yet these three Lines will necessarily make three Angles, and these three Angles will be equal to two right ones, &c." (John Norris, 1704)
- "Not Punch, nor salmagundi, nor any other Drink or Meat, of more repugnant Compounds, can be comprised of more contrary Ingredients, nor work more different Effects in the various Minds of Men and Women, than that sublime! groveling! joyful! melancholy! flourishing! ruinous! happy! distracting! whimsical, and unaccountable, tame, mad Monster, Love!" (William Goodall, 1752)
- "The supper having been removed, and nothing but the dessert, which is comprised of the choicest fruits, and confectionary in all its various forms and claſſes remaining, the party stand prepared for the attack ..." (John Shillibeer, 1818)
- "So the younger division of the party, comprised of Nellie Cahill and Edith Paulton, fell to the rear, and the other division kept the front." (1886)
- "I started another sketch on the strength of this statement, but feeling a bit dubious over his assertion that the one tree was comprised of a whole row, I tackled the 'oldest inhabitant,' an ancient and pensioned park-keeper, who luckily hove in sight." (Harry Furniss, 1902)
- "The body-covering of birds is, without exception, comprised of feathers, and by this character alone birds may be distinguished from all other animals." (Encyclopædia Britannica 11th ed., 1911)
- "The mining towns are comprised of the sudden erections which sprung from the finding of gold in the neighbourhood, and are generally surrounded by thick forest." (Anthony Trollope, 1873)
- "One element of the immediate feelings of the concrescent subject is comprised of the anticipatory feelings of the transcendent future in its relation to the immediate fact." (Alfred North Whitehead, 1929)
- "There is a dead nerveless area on the Left, comprised of the old sense of paralysis before the horror of the gas chamber." (Norman Mailer, 1968)
- "The dualism to which Sartre refers is that of the unconscious id, which is wholly comprised of the instinctual drives, and the conscious ego." (Lionel Trilling, 1972)
- "The book is comprised of a few of the innumerable letters, statements, speeches and articles delivered by me since 1963." (Bertrand Russell, 1967)
- "'The Auroras of Autumn' is comprised of ten sections, each of unrhymed tercets." (Harold Bloom, 2003)
- "I never set out to 'write' a memoir — the book called A Widow's Story is comprised of journal entries from Feb. 11, 2008, through Aug. 29, 2008." (Joyce Carol Oates, 2011)
- "The House of the Spirits is, or rather retrospectively it became, the last of a trilogy that is comprised of itself, preceded by Daughter of Fortune and Portrait in Sepia." (Christopher Hitchens, 2011)

Among more recent examples, the Merriam-Webster Dictionary attributes "about 8 percent of our military forces are comprised of women" to former US President Jimmy Carter. The phrase has also been used in several newspapers and magazines, including The Washington Post, The New Yorker, The Atlantic and The New York Times.

=== In US patents ===
Comprised of is used in US patents as a transition phrase that means "consisting at least of". It is a less-common form of comprises. As of 2007, 134,000 U.S. patents included the phrase.

=== In US law ===
In the context of legal usage, the American lexicographer Bryan A. Garner writes that "The phrase is comprised of is always wrong and should be replaced by either is composed of or comprises." (American linguist Mark Liberman points out that the U.S. Code "apparently includes some 1,880 instances of 'comprised of', and changing them will require many acts of Congress...")

== Syntax ==
Although comprise is a verb, comprised is an adjective if it takes as its complement a preposition phrase headed by of. The distinction between the verb comprise (of course including preterite and past participle "comprised") and adjective comprised is perhaps most easily understood via compose(d):

Treatments of this topic nearly always mistakenly speak of is composed of and is comprised of as passives. They aren't. Compose in its musical/literary sense does have a passive (The Moonlight Sonata was composed by Beethoven), but the part/whole sense doesn't. Nobody says *Brass is composed by copper and zinc. Instead we get Brass is composed of copper and zinc – and there is no understood by-phrase.

Specifically, the word comprised in the phrase comprised of is a participial adjective. (Note: For the distinction between participial adjectives (e.g. uninvolved, also called adjectival participles) and past participles (e.g. enjoyed), see Rodney Huddleston, "The Verb", chap. 3 of Huddleston and Pullum, The Cambridge Grammar of the English Language (Cambridge: Cambridge University Press, 2002; ISBN 0-521-43146-8), pp. 78–79; and "Participial adjectives", The Internet Grammar of English, University College London. See also the discussion of the adjectival passive in Gregory Ward, Betty Birner and Rodney Huddleston, "Information packaging", chap. 16 of The Cambridge Grammar of the English Language, pp. 1436–1440. For a more detailed and technical treatment, see Andrew McIntyre, "Adjectival passives and adjectival participles in English", in Artemis Alexiadou and Florian Schäfer, eds., Non-Canonical Passives (Amsterdam: Benjamins, 2013; ISBN 9789027255884); McIntyre's paper is also freely downloadable here (Lingbuzz). The notion of participial adjective is not new; it can be found in for example Simon Kerl, A Common-School Grammar of the English Language (New York, 1866); here at HathiTrust.) English has a number of adjectives that take as their complements preposition phrases headed by of. Common examples include afraid ("He's afraid of spiders"), aware ("They were aware of the dangers"), and convinced ("They became convinced of their strength"). (Note: A non-exhaustive list of fifty or so such adjectives appears in Pullum and Huddleston, "Adjectives and adverbs", chap. 6 of Huddleston and Pullum, The Cambridge Grammar of the English Language, p. 544.)

In the process of conversion from verb to adjective, complementation may change. The verb comprise does not license a preposition phrase headed by of: its meaning aside, *"The book comprises of a hundred pages" is ungrammatical. (Note: By linguistics convention, an asterisk in front of a putative sentence or phrase denotes its ungrammaticality to native speakers of the language.) However, the adjective comprised requires it: both *"The book is comprised a hundred pages" and *"The book is comprised" are ungrammatical. Grammatically, this is patterned on the conversion of verb compose to adjective composed (although semantically, matters are more complex). However, the sentence "the book comprises a hundred pages" is neither ungrammatical nor tautological.

=== In Malaysian English ===
In Malaysian English, both the adjective comprised and the verb comprise can take a preposition phrase headed by of, as in: "According to our analysis, the voters comprise of 297 Malays, 469 Chinese, 39 Indians and four from other races".

== Semantics ==
The Oxford English Dictionary (OED) shows that the verb comprise has been used with a range of meanings. In its earliest known uses (from 1423), it seems to mean "To lay hold on, take, catch, seize", a sense now obsolete. The word comes from French comprendre (which itself comes from Latin), but while the OED does not call obsolete every comprehension-related sense of comprise, its newest examples are from the 1850s. The OED presents "Of things material: To contain, as parts making up the whole, to consist of (the parts specified)" as the fourth sense, first encountered in 1481. (However, it notes that "Many of the early passages in which this word occurs are so vague that it is difficult to gather the exact sense.") In the English of the 20th and 21st centuries, the part/whole meanings have been overwhelmingly important. Two are exemplified in:

1. "The committee comprises three judges."
2. ^{%}"Three judges comprise the committee". (Note: By linguistics convention, a superscripted percentage mark in front of a putative sentence or phrase denotes its grammaticality to some but not all native speakers of the language.)

The former is not disputed. The latter is less common, and is disputed. It may be the result of a centuries-old malapropism for compose, a malapropism that caught on. Malapropism or no, it is now well established. The OED gives use 8.b of comprise as "to constitute, make up, compose", and dates this back to 1794; and it has been used by respected writers (for example, Charles Dickens).

One may say "The committee is composed of three judges", and also "Three judges compose the committee". Although the former is not a passive clause (as explained in "Syntax", above), it behaves like one semantically.

However, with the meaning of comprise that is the commonest (and is not disputed), the parallel pair is not possible for comprise(d). Instead, it is only possible for the pair ^{%}"The committee is comprised of three judges", and ^{%}"Three judges comprise the committee", both disputed. (Very few native speakers of Standard English would accept *"Three judges are comprised of the committee".)

== Evaluations ==
Comprised of is often deprecated. The authors of The Blue Book of Grammar and Punctuation state that comprised of is never correct because the word comprise by itself already means "composed of". CliffsNotes says "don't use the phrase 'is comprised of'" and does not include an explanation. (Note: This has not led to the removal of comprised of by CliffsNotes' own copyeditors. See for example its occurrences within BTPS Testing, CliffsNotes GMAT with CD-ROM (Boston: Houghton Mifflin Harcourt, 2012; ISBN 978-1-118-07752-8).)

The acceptance of the phrase has increased in recent decades. In the 1960s, 53 percent of the writers and editors on the Usage Panel of the American Heritage Dictionary found comprised of unacceptable. In 1996, this percentage had declined to 35 percent, and by 2011, only 32 percent of the Usage Panel's membership objected to the use of comprised of.

As one of "7 grammar rules you really should pay attention to", University of Delaware journalism and English professor Ben Yagoda says "Don't use comprised of. Instead use composed of/made up of."

The style guide for the British newspaper The Guardian says that "The one thing [about comprise, consist, compose or constitute] to avoid, unless you want people who care about such things to give you a look composed of, consisting of and comprising mingled pity and contempt, is 'comprised of'". Reuters' style guide also advises against using the phrase, as does the IBM style guide.

Simon Heffer elaborated on a short warning in his book Strictly English with a longer one in his Simply English: "A book may comprise fifteen chapters, but it is not comprised of them. Those who say or write such a thing are confusing it with composed of. Another correct way to make the point would be to say that the book 'was constituted of fifteen chapters' or that 'the fifteen chapters constituted the book'."

Certain usage guides warn their readers about the meaning of comprise – despite the appearance within respected dictionaries of the use they deprecate (see "Semantics") – but do not mention comprised of. These include Gowers and Fraser's The Complete Plain Words and the style guides of The Economist and The Times. Other usage compendia have no comment on either comprised of or comprise. (Note: As an example, Fowler, H. W. (1937). A Dictionary of Modern English Usage. Oxford: Oxford University Press. Derivative works may differ. For example, Nicholson, Margaret (1958). A Dictionary of American-English Usage: Based on Fowler's Modern English Usage. New York: New American Library. "[comprise] means include, embrace, NOT compose or constitute. WRONG: The committee is comprised of one delegate from each major country (should read composed).") Although the Oxford English Dictionary notes that certain usages of other words are disparaged, (Note: As an example, the earliest use of disinterested ("Without interest or concern; not interested, unconcerned") is "Often regarded as a loose use".) it does not comment on the acceptability of comprised of (which it glosses as "To be composed of, to consist of").

Overt defenses of comprised of are uncommon, but Harvard University psychology professor Steven Pinker considers its deprecation to be one of "a few fuss-budget decrees you can safely ignore". Oliver Kamm defends it, together with the verb comprise used in the active voice: (Note: As an example of the latter, Kamm quotes Herman Melville in Moby Dick: "Nor do heroes, saints, demigods, and prophets alone comprise the whole roll of our order.") "Merriam-Webster observes that this disputed usage has been in existence for more than a century. The active version of the disputed usage is older still. Neither is unclear in the context; both are legitimate." Conversely, Edinburgh University linguistics professor Geoffrey K. Pullum writes "I'd happily comply with an edict limiting comprise to its original sense ... I see no reason to favor the inverted sense. (Note: "Unfortunately, for centuries the verb comprise has also been used to mean compose. I'll call this the inverted sense.") There's nothing virtuous about the ambiguity and auto-antonymy it promotes. It's easier than you'd think for unclarity to arise about whether an author is saying some abstract X makes up Y or that it consists of Y."

== Variants ==
According to the Oxford Dictionaries, the related construction "x comprises of y and z" is considered incorrect.

== Removal from Wikipedia ==
In 2015, many media outlets, starting with Backchannel, reported that Wikipedia editor Bryan Henderson had manually removed tens of thousands of instances of the phrase comprised of from Wikipedia. Some coverage praised the work as a uniquely focused effort for correctness, but others criticized it as grammatically misguided. Linguist Geoffrey K. Pullum expressed approval of the principle but also doubt about its practicality, saying he would be happy for the editor's "clarifying mission" to succeed. However, Pullum said he "wouldn't bet a dime on his success". Fellow linguist Geoffrey Nunberg has described Henderson's ongoing efforts against the use of the phrase as a "jihad" and an "example of the pedant's veto", and said that the Wikipedia community was "resigned to letting him have his way" despite his mission being illogical.
