= English interjections =

Interjections in the English language

English interjections are a category of English words – such as yeah, ouch, Jesus, oh, mercy, yuck, etc. – whose defining features are the infrequency with which they combine with other words to form phrases, their loose connection to other elements in clauses, and their tendency to express emotive meaning. These features separate English interjections from the language's other lexical categories, such as nouns and verbs. Though English interjections, like interjections in general, are often overlooked in descriptions of the language, English grammars do offer minimal descriptions of the category.

In terms of their phonology, English interjections are typically separated from the surrounding discourses by pauses, and they can contain sounds not otherwise found in English. English interjections tend not to take inflectional or derivational morphemes. In terms of their syntax, they tend not to form constituents with other words and are parenthetical rather than integrated into the clauses in which they occur. Semantically, they often have emotive or interpersonal meanings and their use is sometimes called exclamatory. English interjections fill several pragmatic roles in English, including greeting and indicating agreement.

== History in English grammars ==
In 1586, William Bullokar wrote the earliest grammar of English, which included a small section on interjections. His definition of English interjections focused on the semantic and pragmatic dimensions of the words:

An interjection is a part of speech that betokeneth a sudden passion of the mind: the signification or meaning of which speech much be understanded by the gesture, countenance, or passion of the speaker, and some time with regard of the person spoken to, or of the thing spoken of. (orthography has been modernized)

In 1795, Lindley Murray offered a definition of English interjections that made note of their syntactic properties in addition to their pragmatic properties, defining them as "words thrown in between the parts of a sentence to express the passions or emotions of the speaker: as, 'Oh! I have alienated my friend; alas I fear for life:' 'O virtue! how amiable thou art!'"

In the early twentieth century, Otto Jespersen rejected the idea that English interjections are a lexical category at all, treating interjections instead as a manner in which words of other lexical categories may be used (such as the noun Fiddlesticks! and the verb Come!).

Later in the twentieth century, A Comprehensive Grammar of the English Language included interjections in its list of word classes but conceded that they are a "marginal and anomalous class." It also noted that interjections differ from similar word classes in that "they are grammatically peripheral, in the sense that they do not enter into constructions with other word classes, and are only loosely connected to sentences with which they may be orthographically or phonologically associated."

In their Student's Introduction to English Grammar, Rodney Huddleston and Geoffrey K. Pullum omit interjections from their list of lexical categories because, in their view, "there really isn't anything interesting for a grammar to say" about interjections.

== Typical examples ==
Though the number of traditionally recognized English interjections is relatively small compared to other lexical categories, nonce interjections can be freely created through onomatopoeia. Thus, a complete list of English interjections is impossible. However, very common interjections can be listed. The most frequent words tagged as interjections in the Corpus of Global Web-Based English (GloWbE) (Note: The countries and regions represented in the corpus are: Australia, Bangladesh, Canada, Ghana, the United Kingdom, Hong Kong, India, the Republic of Ireland, Jamaica, Kenya, Malaysia, New Zealand, Nigeria, Pakistan, the Philippines, Singapore, South Africa, Sri Lanka, Tanzania, and the United States) include yes, no, oh, yeah, hi, hey, wow, hello, ah, ha, blah, eh, yep, o, alas, haha, cheers, huh, and hmm.

== English interjections vs. other types of words ==
=== Interjections vs. nouns ===
There are a number of English interjections with religious connotations that are derived from nouns (e.g., Jesus, Christ, God, heavens, hell). The main difference, between these interjections and their corresponding nouns is that the interjections have been bleached of their original meaning; that is, they are no longer used to refer to the entity that the noun originally referred to. For example, the interjection Jesus does not actually refer to a person or thing whereas the noun often does.

=== Interjections vs. verbs ===
Another subcategory of English interjections includes words derived from verbs. This derivation from verbs is most apparent when they occur with noun phrase complements, as in Damn these mosquitoes! (expressing frustration). But in such cases, there is no subject present or intended, as there would be with a verb. The Cambridge Grammar of the English Language concludes that "it may be best to regard such words as exceptional interjections that combine with an NP [noun phrase] complement to form an interjection phrase."

Some verbs are formed from interjections meaning "utter the interjection", for example, he humphed and sat down or I shooed them out the door or The audience booed when he stepped on stage. These can be distinguished from interjections by their ability to inflect for tense. (See § Morphology.)

=== Interjections vs. adverbs ===
Linguists and lexicographers do not agree on where the boundary between interjection and adverb should be marked in English. Because English interjections do not inflect, some dictionaries and grammars have classified certain interjections as adverbs, another lexical category that tends not to inflect. The Oxford English Dictionary, for example, classifies the word pop in pop went the cork as an adverb rather than an interjection. However, linguists such as Maruszka Eve Marie Meinard argue that the two categories can be distinguished on syntactic grounds: interjections are syntactically isolated while adverbs can form constituents with other words. Under this view, the pop in pop went the cork is not an adverb because it is not signifying that the cork had "gone in a popping manner"; rather, went is introducing a kind of direct speech, much as in John went "wow". Meinard argues that because direct speech is syntactically isolated from the clause that introduces it, words like pop and wow in these examples behave more like interjections than adverbs.

Some adverbs overlap in their distribution with interjections. For example, certainly and probably can appear where yeah or yes can, albeit as upgraded and downgraded confirmations respectively.

=== Interjections vs. fillers ===
Fillers are words like well and um that fill gaps in discourse while speakers search for words, or are often used for effect, e.g. She was, um, not the most intelligent of teachers is a politer way of saying she was stupid. Fillers share certain features with interjections, most notably they are distinct from the rest of the clause in terms of both prosody and syntax, which has led to many English dictionaries classifying fillers as a kind of interjection. For example, both the American Heritage Dictionary and Merriam-Webster Dictionary classify um as an interjection. However, some psycholinguists, such as Daniel C. O’Connell and Sabine Kowal, treat English interjections and fillers as different categories, arguing that English interjections

- tend to occur without pauses before or after them, whereas fillers tend to occur after a pause,
- can introduce citations while fillers do not, and
- tend to receive emphasis, such as through loudness or articulation rate, whereas fillers do not.

=== Interjections vs. routine formulae ===
Florian Coulmas defines routine formulae as "highly conventionalized prepatterned expressions whose occurrence is tied to more or less standard communication situations." In English, this category includes words such as bye, hello, sorry, thank you, and the like. In traditional grammar, routine formulae are categorized as interjections. Felix Ameka has questioned applying this categorization to English, citing three primary objections. First, routine formulae have addressees while interjections do not; that is, formulae are directed to someone while interjections may or may not be directed at someone. Second, routine formulae are predictable responses to social conventions while interjections are not; for example, a person might say "thank you" because that is the expected response in a social context, say receiving a gift. Third, routine formulae are always speech acts while interjections merely reflect the mental states of the speaker. Other linguists, such as David P. Wilkins, have argued that routine formulae share important characteristics with interjections in both English and Italian, and distinctions like those that Ameka discusses only suggest that routine formulae are "a distinct pragmatic and semantic subtype of interjections," not a lexical category of their own.

== Syntax ==
=== English interjections as heads of phrases ===
Little has been said about the syntax of English interjections apart from pointing out that they generally do not form phrases or constituents with other words. But English interjections derived from verbs may exceptionally combine with noun phrase complements, such as the noun phrase these mosquitoes in damn these mosquitoes. The Cambridge Grammar of the English Language suggests treating these exceptional phrases as "interjection phrases" with the interjection (e.g., damn) as a head and the noun phrase (e.g., these mosquitoes) as a complement.

In exceptional cases, English interjections derived from nouns can take modifiers (e.g., holy cow, hot damn, bloody hell, etc.). Conventionalized pairs like oh boy, oh my, fuck yeah, aw shucks, good bye, ho hum, etc. also exist. Bloomfield calls these conventionalized pairs "secondary interjections", and some linguists, such as Ameka, call them "interjectional phrases".

=== Function ===
Syntactically, English interjections primarily function as supplements, that is "parenthetical strings that are not integrated in clause structure, including what are called non-restrictive relative clauses in other frameworks, as well as certain adjuncts and disjuncts." In the sentence Damn, we're going to be late!, for example, the interjection damn is not a complement or modifier of anything in the rest of the clause but, rather, is appended to the beginning of the clause as a supplement.

Though their function as supplements is one of the defining features of English interjections, the supplement function may be realized by other units in English. These include relative clauses, noun phrases, adjective phrases, prepositional phrases, and adverb phrases:

- Interjection: Ah, so you were there after all!
- Relative clause: We called in to see Sue's parents, which made us rather late.
- Noun phrase: A university professor, Dr. Brown, was arrested for the crime.
- Adjective phrase: The editor, angry at the delay, resigned from the project.
- Adverb phrase: Frankly, I think we could do better ourselves.

== Pragmatics ==
From the point of view of pragmatics, English interjections typically have exclamatory or imperative force; for example, ouch! is an exclamation expressing the speaker's pain and hush! issues a demand for the addressees to become silent. However, they can also be used to convey statements and questions (such as in uh-huh and eh?, respectively). English interjections can be used to greet people or call attention (e.g., hey, hello), show agreement (e.g., yes, amen, okay) or disagreement (e.g., no, uh-uh), indicate understanding (e.g., oh, uh-huh) or lack thereof (e.g., huh), demand silence (e.g., sh), make a polite request (e.g., please), show disinterest (e.g., meh), or even invoke magic (e.g., abracadabra).

Many of the most common English interjections (see § Typical examples) are primarily involved in interactions between users of the language, maintaining the integrity of the conversation through backchanneling and marking affirmation. For example, a listener may say "yeah" or "uh-huh" to signal their attention to and understanding of a speaker's words.

== Semantics ==
Semantically speaking, English interjections do not refer; that is, while other lexical classes like nouns and verbs typically reference particular participants or processes that exist or could exist in the world, English interjections tend to merely express the internal states of their users. Many express emotions such as anger (e.g., damn), disgust (e.g., eww, yuck), surprise (e.g., wow), regret (e.g., alas), or embarrassment (e.g., shucks). They can also signify pain (e.g., ow), bad smells (e.g., pew), a mistake (e.g., oops), or a sudden realization (e.g., eureka).

== Morphology ==
English interjections tend not to inflect or form through derivation. Some other lexical categories in English also tend not to inflect but still carry inflectional morphemes associated with other categories; for instance, English prepositions tend not to inflect, but the prepositions barring and concerning contain remnants of the -ing suffix of present participle verb forms. The same is true of English interjections. For example, the interjections heavens and bollocks contain remnants of the plural -s inflectional suffix from when they were nouns.

== Phonology ==
Phonologically, English interjections or interjection phrases are often supplements and, as such, are typically separated by a pause from the other utterances with which they may co-occur, constituting a prosodic unit by themselves. This disruption to the typical prosody of the clause is represented in writing through punctuation – such as commas, dashes, and parentheses. For instance, the dash in the previous sentence marks such a disruption.

English interjections may exhibit phonological features that are not typical of the language. For example, the interjection uh-oh ([əʔo]) is a rare case of a glottal stop in dialects of English that otherwise lack such stops. Other examples of English interjections containing phonemes not normally found in English include the denti-alveolar clicks in tut-tut ([ǀǀ]), the voiceless bilabial fricative in whew ([ɸɪu]), and (for dialects that no longer use it) the voiceless velar fricative in ugh ([əx]). Spelling pronunciations often emerge for interjections that feature these atypical phonemes, including /tət tət/ for tut-tut and /əɡ/ for ugh.

== Variation ==
Use of interjections varies over time and between speaker groups.

Geographical variation can be seen in the use of interjections like lah, which are found almost exclusively in Singapore and Malaysia in the GloWbE corpus, yaar, which is almost entirely limited to India and Pakistan, or haba, which is almost entirely limited to Nigeria. Variation can also exist among speaker groups within one area. For example, the interjection word indicating agreement is characteristic of African-American English.

Two examples of variation over time can be seen in the Corpus of Historical American English, which shows that nay was among the most common interjections in 1820 but by the 2010s had become significantly less common. In contrast, yeah does not occur in the corpus in 1820, but is among the most used interjections by the 2010s.
