= Betty Birner =

American linguist

Betty J. Birner is an American linguist. Her research focuses on pragmatics and discourse analysis, particularly the identification of the types of contexts appropriate for sentences with marked word order.

== Research ==
She has been part of a movement to expand the field's understanding of how information structure (one's familiarity with the referents being discussed) affects the interpretations of sentences with different word orders, especially in English utterances with constituent inversion. Inversion is the term for sentence types where the parts before and after the verb switch places. For example, (a) sentences below appear in regular, or canonical, English word order, while the (b) sentences show inversion:

1. a) Mr. Thompson was listed last.

   b) Listed last was Mr. Thompson.

2. a) The black cat raced into John’s kitchen.

   b) Into John’s kitchen raced the black cat.

== Biography ==
Birner received a PhD in linguistics from Northwestern University in 1992. She worked for two years in a postdoctoral fellowship at the University of Pennsylvania’s Institute for Research in Cognitive Science. She is currently a Professor of Linguistics and Cognitive Science in the English department at Northern Illinois University. She has also served as an instructor at the 2007 LSA Summer Institute at Stanford University.

In addition to scholarly monographs and journal articles, in the 1990s she wrote and edited a series of brochures for the Linguistic Society of America that explained for the general public such topics as Bilingualism, Is English Changing? and Does the language I speak influence the way I think?

The volume Cambridge Grammar of the English Language to which she contributed was the winner of the 2004 Leonard Bloomfield Book Award from the Linguistic Society of America.

== Publications ==
Birner, Betty J. 2017. Language and Meaning. Abingdon: Routledge.

Birner, Betty. J. 2012. Introduction to pragmatics. John Wiley & Sons.

Gregory Ward and Betty J. Birner. “Discourse Effects of Word Order Variation.” In K. von Heusinger, C. Maienborn, and P. Portner, eds., Semantics: An International Handbook of Natural Language Meaning. Berlin/Boston: Mouton de Gruyter, 2011. Vol. 2.

Birner, Betty J. 2009. “Noncanonical Word Order and the Distribution of Inferrable Information in English.” In B. Shaer, P. Cook, and W. Frey, eds. Dislocation: Syntactic, Semantic, and Discourse Perspectives. Routledge.

Birner, Betty J., Jeffrey P. Kaplan, and Gregory Ward. 2007. Functional compositionality and the interaction of discourse constraints. Language 83.2: 317–343.

Birner, Betty J. and Gregory Ward, eds. 2006. Drawing the Boundaries of Meaning: Neo-Gricean Studies in Pragmatics and Semantics in Honor of Laurence R. Horn. [Studies in Language Companion Series, Volume 80.] Amsterdam/Philadelphia: John Benjamins.

Rodney Huddleston and Geoffrey K. Pullum, in collaboration with Laurie Bauer, Betty J. Birner, Ted Briscoe, Peter Collins, David Denison, David Lee, Anita Mittwoch, Geoffrey Nunberg, Frank Palmer, John Payne, Peter Peterson, Lesley Stirling, and Gregory Ward. 2002. The Cambridge Grammar of the English Language. Cambridge: Cambridge University Press.

Birner, Betty J. and Gregory Ward. 1998. Information Status and Noncanonical Word Order in English. Amsterdam/Philadelphia: John Benjamins.

Birner, Betty J. 1996. The discourse function of inversion in English.

Birner, Betty J. 1995. "Pragmatic constraints on the verb in English inversion“ Lingua.

Birner, Betty J. 1994. "Information status and word order: An analysis of English inversion." Language.

Gregory Ward and Birner, Betty J. 1993. "The semantics and pragmatics of 'and everything'," Journal of Pragmatics.
