= Terence Mitchell (disambiguation) =

Terence or Terrance Mitchell can refer to:

- Terence Mitchell (1929–2019), museum curator at the British Museum
- Terence Frederick Mitchell (1919–2007), British linguist
- Terrance Mitchell (born 1992), American football player

== See also ==
- Terry Mitchell (born 1950), New Zealand former rugby union player
- Terry Riley, born Terrence Mitchell Riley (born 1935), American composer and performing musician
