= And/or =

Grammatical conjunction purported to give more information than 'or'

And/or is an English grammatical conjunction used to indicate that one, more, or all of the cases it connects may occur. It is used as an inclusive or (as in logic and mathematics), because or in spoken or written English might be inclusive or exclusive.

The construction has been used in official, legal, and business documents since the mid-19th century, and evidence of broader use appears in the 20th century. It has been criticized as both ugly in style—by many style guides, including the classic The Elements of Style (from William Strunk, Jr. and E.B. White)—and ambiguous in legal documents—by American and British courts.

== Alternatives ==
Two alternatives have been proposed. The first, when used for just two items, is to replace "x and/or y" with "x or y or both." The second is to simply choose which of and or or to use.

== Mutual exclusivity ==
The word or does not entail mutual exclusivity by itself. The word either can be used to convey mutual exclusivity. "When using either as a conjunction, [it can be applied] to more than two elements in a series." Thus,

"He will eat either cake, pie, or brownies"

appropriately indicates that the choices are mutually exclusive. If the function of or is clear from the context, it is not necessary to use either as a conjunction:

Person 1: You may select one item for dessert.

Person 2: What are my choices?

Person 1: You may eat cake, pie, or brownies.

== Criticism ==
References on English usage strongly criticize the phrase as "ugly" and "Janus-faced". William Strunk, Jr., and E.B. White, in their classic The Elements of Style–recognized by Time one of the 100 best and most influential non-fiction books written in English since 1923, say and/or is "A device, or shortcut, that damages a sentence and often leads to confusion or ambiguity". Roy H. Copperud, in A Dictionary of Usage and Style, says that the phrase is "Objectionable to many, who regard it as a legalism".

=== Legal criticism ===
The phrase has come under criticism in both American and British courts. Judges have called it a "freakish fad", an "accuracy-destroying symbol", and "meaningless". In a Wisconsin Supreme Court opinion from 1935, Justice Chester A. Fowler referred to it as "that befuddling, nameless thing, that Janus-faced verbal monstrosity, neither word nor phrase, the child of a brain of someone too lazy or too dull to know what he did mean". The Kentucky Supreme Court has said it was a "much-condemned conjunctive-disjunctive crutch of sloppy thinkers". Finally, the Florida Supreme Court has denounced the use of "and/or", stating

...we take our position with that distinguished company of lawyers who have condemned its use. It is one of those inexcusable barbarisms which were sired by indolence and damned by indifference, and has no more place in legal terminology than the vernacular of Uncle Remus has in Holy Writ. I am unable to divine how such senseless jargon becomes current. The coiner of it certainly had no appreciation for terse and concise law English.

Other authorities claim that it is usually quite unambiguous and can be the most efficient way to indicate the inclusive or in some contexts. Kenneth Adams, lecturer at the University of Pennsylvania Law School, and Alan S. Kaye, professor of linguistics at California State University, write, "It does, after all, have a specific meaning—X and/or Y means X or Y or both." However, the authors state that it should not be used in language of obligation.

The legal usage authority Bryan A. Garner stated that use of the term is particularly harmful in legal writing because a bad-faith reader of a contract can pick whichever suits them, the and or the or. Courts called on to interpret it have applied a wide variety of standards, with little agreement.

== See also ==
- Logical conjunction and disjunction
- Comprised of
- Etc.
- ...
- He/she
