= The Cambridge Grammar of the English Language =

2002 compendium on the English language

- Book cover
- Author: Rodney Huddleston; Geoffrey K. Pullum
- Subject: Comprehensive descriptive grammar of the English language
- Publisher: Cambridge University Press
- Publication date: April 15, 2002
- Media type: Print (hardcover)
- Pages: 1,860
- ISBN: 0-521-43146-8
- OCLC: 46641801

The Cambridge Grammar of the English Language (CamGEL (Note: The abbreviation CamGEL is less commonly used for the work than is CGEL (and the authors themselves use CGEL in their other works), but CGEL is ambiguous because it has also often been used for the earlier work A Comprehensive Grammar of the English Language. This article uses the unambiguous form.)) is a descriptive grammar of the English language. Its primary authors are Rodney Huddleston and Geoffrey K. Pullum. Huddleston was the only author to work on every chapter. It was published by Cambridge University Press in 2002 and has been cited more than 8,000 times.

== Background ==
In 1988, Huddleston published a very critical review of the 1985 book A Comprehensive Grammar of the English Language. He wrote:

[T]here are some respects in which it is seriously flawed and disappointing. A number of quite basic categories and concepts do not seem to have been thought through with sufficient care; this results in a remarkable amount of unclarity and inconsistency in the analysis, and in the organization of the grammar.

A year later, the University of Queensland provided a special projects grant to launch a project for an alternative reference grammar, and Huddleston began work on what was provisionally titled The Cambridge Grammar of English. (Note: The eventual title – whose obvious abbreviation CGEL was already in wide use for A Comprehensive Grammar of the English Language – was imposed by the publisher. Pullum, Geoffrey K. (29 July 2002). "Some points of agreement about the Cambridge Grammar". Linguist List. Archived from the original on March 8, 2023.) From 1989 to 1995, "workshops were held regularly in Brisbane and Sydney to develop ideas for the framework and content of the grammar". Pullum joined the project in 1995, after Huddleston "bemoaned the problems he was having in maintaining the momentum of this huge project, at that time already five years underway".

== Contributors ==
Huddleston is the sole author of seven of the chapters and co-author of the other thirteen. Pullum is co-author of six chapters. In alphabetical order, the other authors are Laurie Bauer, Betty J. Birner, Ted Briscoe, Peter Collins, Anita Mittwoch, Geoffrey Nunberg, John Payne, Frank Palmer, Peter Peterson, Lesley Stirling, and Gregory Ward.

Additionally, Ray Cattell, David Denison and David Lee provided "crucial draft material".

A board of consultants comprised Barry Blake, Bernard Comrie, Greville Corbett, Edward Finegan, John Lyons, Peter Matthews, Keith Mitchell, Frank Palmer, John Payne, Neil Smith, Roland Sussex, and the late James D. McCawley.

== Style ==
CamGEL is a descriptive grammar with the main objective of reducing "the large gap that exists between traditional grammar and the partial descriptions of English grammar proposed by those working in the field of linguistics." Ostensibly, it is written for a reader with no background in English grammar or linguistics, though, as Geoffrey Leech notes, "in practice the intensity of detail, including much unfamiliar terminology, is likely to deter the nonspecialist." It includes a list of sources for further reading but does not cite any sources in the main text. It is informal in the sense that it is not based on a grammatical formalism.

Though it includes a lexical index and a conceptual index, it is not structured to facilitate the simple look-up of a particular fact or concept. Instead, it is mostly expository, with many lists and examples and 40 tree diagrams.

== Analysis ==
CamGEL does not explicitly put forward a theory of grammar, but the implicit theory is a model theoretic phrase structure grammar, rejecting any kind of transformation. Every node in the phrase structure tree is denoted with a category label, either lexical or phrasal. The edges are labelled with a function label that denotes the syntactic function (always distinguished from category) of the child node in the parent node. The result is a tree like the following. This presents this is a tree as a clause. The clause is made up of a noun phrase (NP) which functions as the subject of the clause and a verb phrase (VP), which functions as the head of the clause. The VP, in turn, is made up of a verb (V), which functions as its head and an NP which functions as its predicative complement (PredComp). (As indicated by the triangle, the internal details of each NP are not shown.)

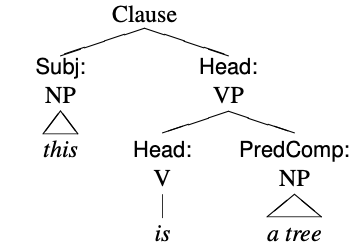

=== Lexical and phrasal categories ===
The lexical and phrasal categories are given in the following table.

Lexical and phrasal categories in CamGEL
Lexical category	Phrasal category	
Noun (N)	Nominal (Nom)	Noun phrase (NP)
Verb (V)	Verb phrase (VP)	Clause
Adjective (Adj)	Adjective phrase (AdjP)	
Adverb (Adv)	Adverb phrase (AdvP)	
Preposition (P)	Preposition phrase (PP)	
Determinative (D)	Determinative phrase (DP)	
Interjection	Interjection phrase	
Coordinator		
Subordinator		

The category Noun includes Pronoun; the category Verb includes Auxiliary Verb; the categories Adverb and Preposition are respectively much reduced and enlarged from those in traditional accounts of grammar; the category Determinative is by some other authors called "determiner" (a term that CamGEL uses for a function); the category Coordinator approximates to what are traditionally termed "coordinating conjunctions"; the category Subordinator is used for a small subset of what have traditionally been termed "subordinating conjunctions" (the great majority of which are categorized as Prepositions).

Syntacticians tend to analyse a constituent such as the good weather either as headed by weather or as headed by the. (Note: The latter, often termed the "DP analysis", was first put forward by Steven Abney, The English noun phrase in its sentential aspect (PhD dissertation, MIT, 1987).) CamGEL argues for the former approach, whereby the good weather is termed a Noun Phrase, and its head good weather is termed a Nominal. It also follows John Ross in analyzing auxiliaries as main verbs (a "catenative-auxiliary analysis") rather than dependents (a "dependent-auxiliary analysis").

According to CamGEL, a clause is a kind of phrase headed by a VP, but CamGEL includes a discussion of "verbless clauses", which lack a head VP. This apparent discrepancy is not explained.

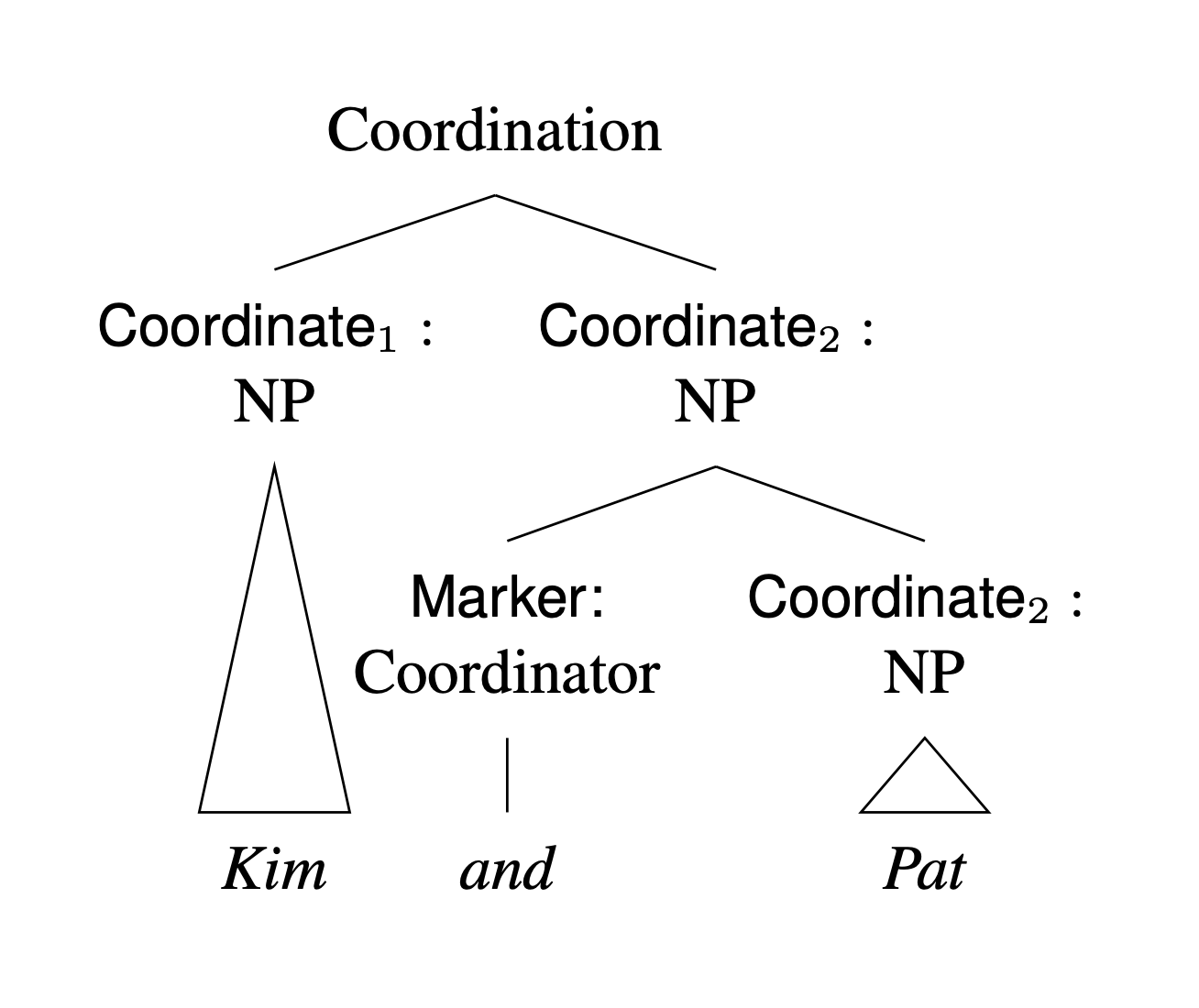
Tree diagram for "Kim and Pat" in the style of The Cambridge Grammar of the English Language

Along with the above, CamGEL includes the category of coordination, which is neither lexical nor, lacking a head, phrasal. The structure of the coordination is taken to be two or more coordinates with the last coordinate typically including a coordinator in marker function as in the tree Kim and Pat.

=== Syntactic functions ===
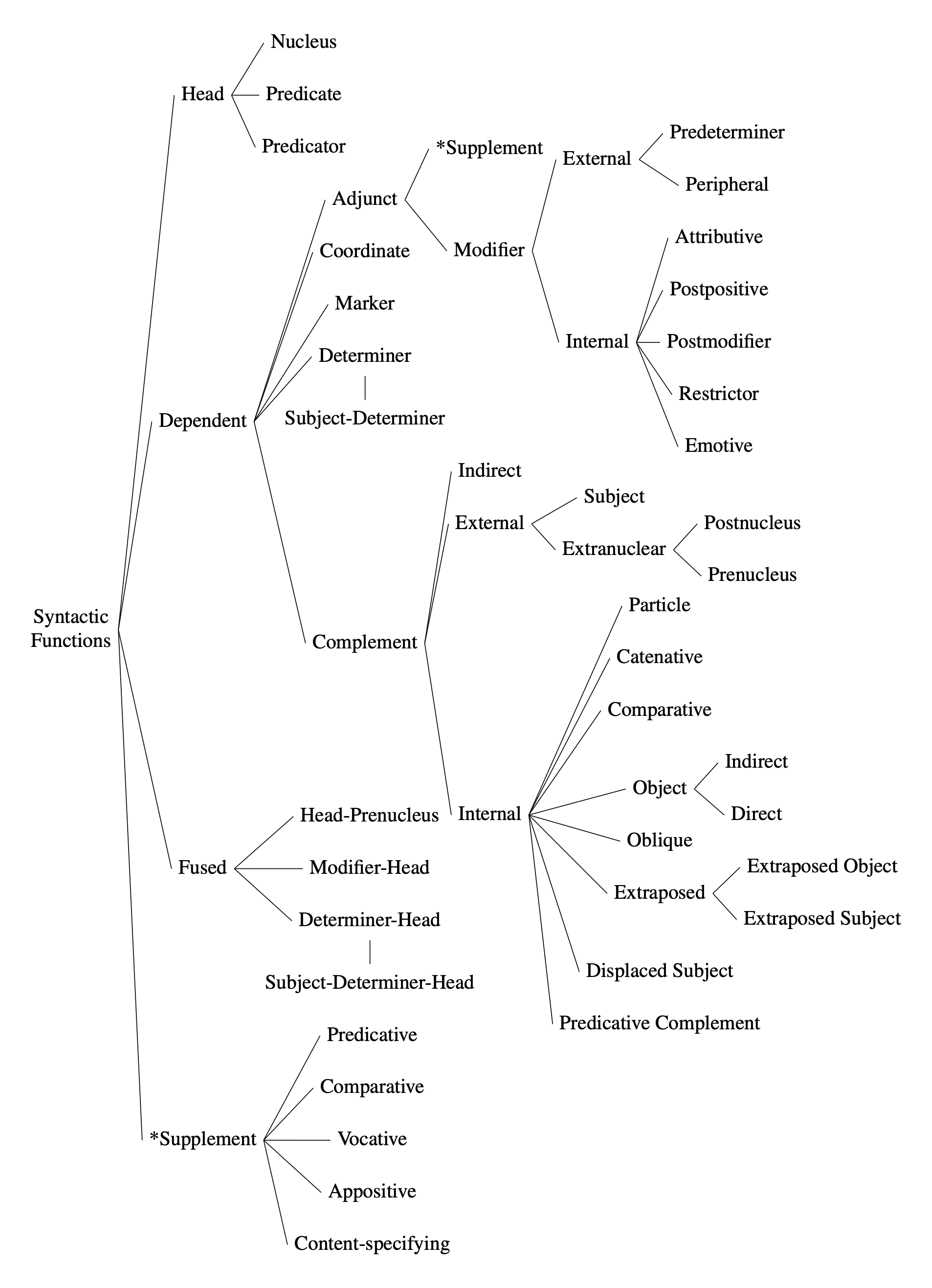
The full list of functions is presented in the following diagram.

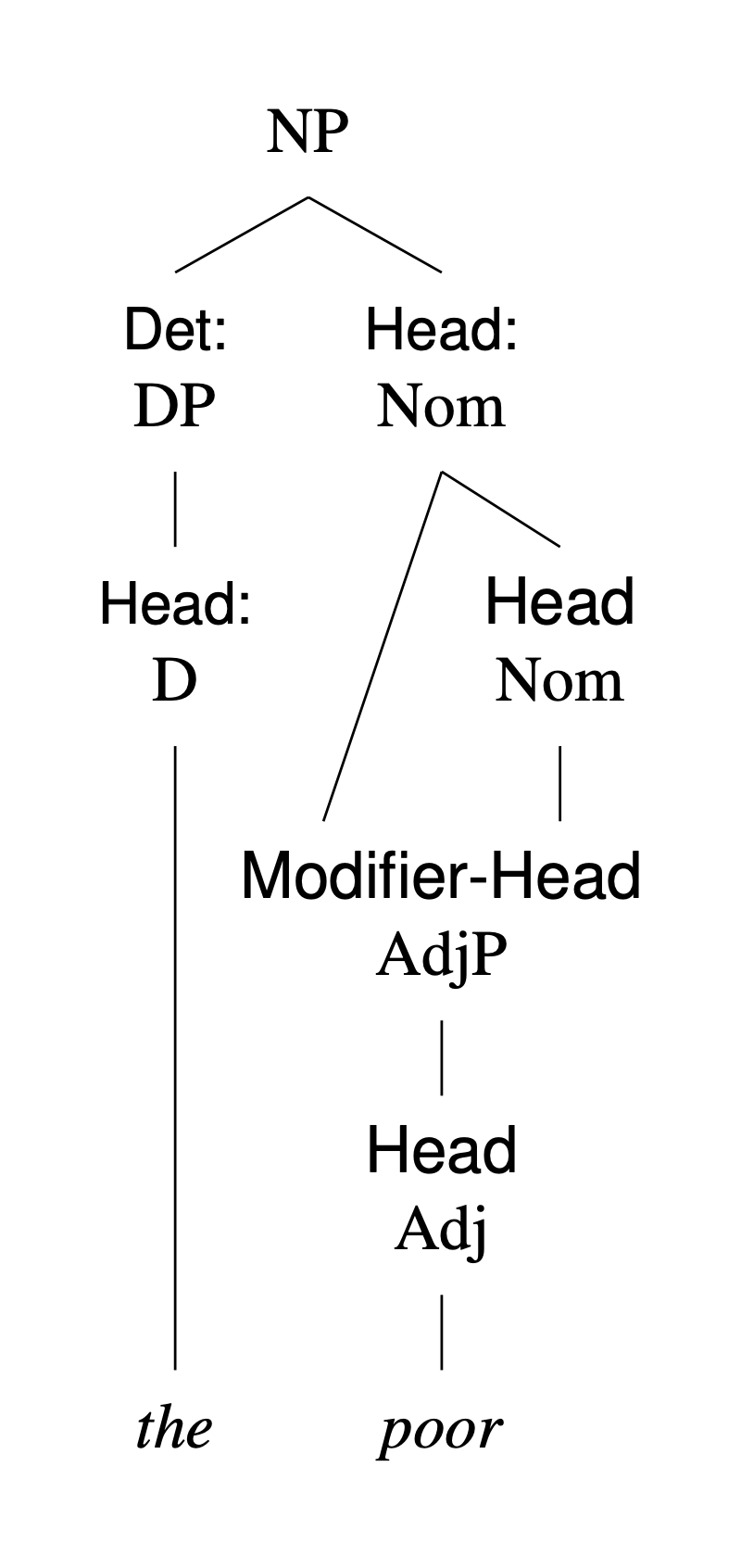
Tree diagram showing a fused modifier-head in English

As Leech observes, "the headedness of constructions is a pervasive principle." That is to say that every phrase has a head. An innovative analysis involves fusion of functions to account for a noun phrase that lacks a head noun. Here, CamGEL claims that the function of determiner, modifier, or predeterminer may be "fused" with the head, as in the poor (see the accompanying diagram).

== Reception ==
After a description and general praise, an early (2002) review of CamGEL by Joybrato Mukherjee changed gear with "There are many analyses that I feel uneasy about". He outlined three, in particular one that "concerns the data and the 'evidence' that have been drawn on by the authors". Mukherjee expected the English whose grammatical structure was described to have been attested in naturally occurring utterances. The book's failure to do this, he suggested, was what allowed CamGEL to describe sentences without extraposition to be described as more "basic" than their far more commonly occurring extraposed equivalents. (Note: To take an example from CamGEL: That he hasn't phoned worries me is more "basic" than a version with subject extraposition: It worries me that he hasn't phoned.) Despite calling the book a "notable and outstanding achievement", he wrote that it "comes across as a quaint anachronism: too many axiomatic assumptions (such as a strictly binary-branching constituent structure) are taken for granted prima facie, and the language data are not consistently and systematically obtained from naturally occurring discourse".

In a sharp response, Pullum pointed out that Mukherjee had mischaracterized not only CamGEL but also the two reference grammars he had compared it with, and had made various misunderstandings, among them that "basic" in the particular context meant something other than "syntactically simple". (Note: "[T]he non-canonical version is syntactically less basic by virtue of its greater syntactic complexity [thanks to] the addition of one or more elements, such as . . . it . . ." (CamGEL, p. 1367). "[W]here the element concerned is a content clause or an infinitival clause, the version with extraposition is much more frequent than the basic one . . ." (CamGEL, p. 1404).)

Reviewing the book for the journal Computational Linguistics, Chris Brew suggested computational applications never envisaged by its authors. And for a wider readership:

[CamGEL] is both a modern complement to existing descriptive grammars (Quirk et al. 1985; Biber et al. 1999) and an important resource for anyone interested in working with or finding out about English. In addition, the book is a very complete and convincing demonstration that the ideas of modern theoretical linguistics can be deployed in the detailed description of a particular language.

Reviewing CamGEL, Robert McColl Millar welcomed the inclusion of examples of Australian English, but wished that "more space had been given to the variation inherent in British varieties of Standard English and in particular the Scottish variety thereof". The book, he wrote, "probably would not be the first point of reference for a learner of [English]. . . . It would be very useful to advanced learners, nonetheless. . . .

Lori Morris particularly appreciated the first chapter ("Preliminaries"), the book's canonical–non-canonical distinction (for its help in structuring the content of the book), the treatment of number, its "excellent, accessible look at sentence structure, semantics, and pragmatics", and the treatment of information packaging. However, she was dissatisfied by the conception of tense, aspect and mood and its exposition.

Thus, at the risk of being labelled a grammatical Luddite, I can conclude that [CamGEL] is unlikely to replace or even displace [Q et al] on my shelf. For those with an interest in sentence-level grammar, however, Huddleston and Pullum’s work might well prove more appealing than [Q et al]'s and ultimately come to be their grammar of predilection.

Bas Aarts wrote: "CaGEL is an awe-inspiring tome which offers a comprehensive descriptive account of the grammar of English. It is based on recent descriptive and theoretical research, and is without doubt the most up-to-date and wide-ranging grammar of English currently available." Nevertheless, he regretted "that CaGEL used exclusively written material, especially in an age when spoken material is readily available" and implied that the "strictly Aristotelian (all-or-none) framework" which required each word or phrase to be of a single category caused problems for certain analyses such as raising to object. He also questioned the analysis of infinitival to as subordinator rather than as defective auxiliary verb. Finally, he noted "the very sparse bibliographical information that it supplies", which he finds "woefully inadequate".

Jean Aitchison regretted the book's concentration on written English (and particularly on certain kinds of written English), and the lack of information of the sources of those examples that were not simply made up for the book. She also regretted analytical and terminological innovation, which she found no more rewarding than attempts to reform English spelling. ("Minor tidying up may be all that is feasible.") (Note: Despite her praise for the book's clear distinction between category and function, she wrote "CamGEL does indeed use the word determiner, but restricts its use to a subtype of determinatives." (CamGEL uses it, but for a function.)) "A plus point is the clear distinction it makes between structure and function"; and she particularly appreciated chapter 16, on information packaging. But all in all Aitchison put the book in third place in usefulness to the reader, behind both Quirk et al's A Comprehensive Grammar and Douglas Biber et al's Longman Grammar of Spoken and Written English.

After stating that this is "an important work – well written, impeccably organized, and full of insight into the structure of contemporary standard English", Alan S. Kaye quoted Edward Sapir's adage that "all grammars leak", (Note: "Were a language ever completely 'grammatical', it would be a perfect engine of conceptual expression. Unfortunately, or luckily, no language is tyrannically consistent. All grammars leak." Edward Sapir, Language: An Introduction to the Study of Speech (New York: Harcourt, Brace, 1921), p. 21.) and explored what CamGEL terms the bare genitive: exemplified by "the Jones' car" (as an optional alternative to "the Jones's car"), the genitive inflection signalled by an apostrophe for the reader but phonologically bare for the listener). Kaye argued a number of minor points related to this, among them that what CamGEL presents as for convenience' sake lacked an apostrophe for his American informants. (Note: Kaye did not mention that CamGEL itself hedges here: "An optional bare genitive is found in certain types of proper names. . . . There is a good deal of variation here and it is not possible to give hard and fast rules" (p. 1596).)

Pieter de Haan saw the book as "a series of remarks about syntactic points, which in themselves are generally interesting enough but do not all contribute to a unified description of the language". He pointed out a number of omissions, for example that one difference between He was dripping blood and He was dripping with blood is illuminated by the grammaticality contrast between *He was dripping rain (Note: In accordance with linguistics convention, an asterisk indicates ungrammaticality.) and He was dripping with rain. He was also dissatisfied by the recategorization as prepositions of the vast majority of what had traditionally been classed as subordinating conjunctions. (Note: Rather than "subordinating conjunction", de Haan used the term "subordinator".) Whereas since in since yesterday and since we met have very different complements and thus are traditionally assigned to different categories, "[t]his is no ground for distinguishing them, according to Huddleston, because we see the same variation in complementation in verbs." Yet, says de Haan: "The flaw in Huddleston's argument is of course that the class of verbs is established independently from the complementation they take, and on quite different grounds, for instance the ability of being marked for tense." De Haan concluded that CamGEL was an excellent grammar by and for linguists, but not for language teachers.

Huddleston and Pullum responded to a number of aspects of de Haan's review, notably by arguing for the coherence of their expanded category of Preposition. They concluded by saying that:

This short and necessarily selective response is not an objection to critical scrutiny of our work or disagreement with it. In our view the whole canon of English grammar has received too little critical attention these last hundred years or more. Our work should certainly be subjected to close examination and perhaps argued against. (Note: De Haan responded to this with a brief "Rejoinder" (doi:10.1080/00138380600989678) on the following pages.)

Christian Mair's review of CamGEL saw it as "the first direct challenge" to A Comprehensive Grammar. He found that the authors "have done an admirable job, covering a vast range of facts in a theoretical and terminological framework which [is] as a whole certainly more coherent" than that of the older work. The freshness of this framework contrasted, however, with the concentration on "relatively conservative written English". Mair found CamGEL less informative than A Comprehensive Grammar about regional variation. Despite finding the descriptions in certain places not fully adequate,

The final verdict [CamGEL must] be an almost unreservedly positive one. [It] has achieved its major aim because it represents an advance on [A Comprehensive Grammar] – first for the obvious reason that the results of recent research have been incorporated but secondly also because the authors have, on the whole, been successful in their attempt to make the description as theoretically coherent as possible.

Geoffrey Leech wrote:

[E]very so often, there appears a book which is important enough to fill the reviewer with something like awe... [Its] strength lies more in being a consolidation and synthesis of existing linguistic theory and description. But to suggest that The Cambridge Grammar of the English Language is backward-looking in any sense is misleading, as it also contains a great deal that is new, if not daringly provocative, in its reworking of the well-tilled territory of English grammar. The depth and richness of detail, as well as the breadth of coverage, are extraordinarily impressive, so that there is scarcely a topic that grammatical old-timers like myself cannot read without fresh insight and understanding.

Some of Leech's criticism echoed Aarts's. He too regretted the lack of spoken material and support from corpora. He too noted the Aristotelian framework in pointing out the authors' "determination to arrive at a single correct analysis" and felt that "the desire to seek a decisive answer to all research questions is too strong, in particular, when examples of borderline acceptability are judged to be either fully grammatical or fully ungrammatical."

The literary critic Eric Griffiths was dissatisfied with the book's criteria for acceptability. He conceded that linguists "are witnesses not judges"; however, he added that "the members of this excellent Cambridge team . . . rightly decline to prescribe usage, but they exceed their remit when they proscribe prescription." Griffiths also regretted that the book did not consider the English of poetry, or that of the past.

Tony Bex opined that "it will, deservedly, replace its predecessor A Comprehensive Grammar of the English Language." At the same time, he found "it bizarre that there is no reference to Indian or Caribbean English," and asked rhetorically, "are these not varieties of ‘Standard English’, or do the speakers of these variants only achieve the grammaticality described in this volume when they adopt one of the white varieties?"

Thomas Herbst praised the fresh approach that the book took to a variety of grammatical phenomena, and recommended the blue-shaded, more advanced discussions to "any student of English linguistics".

In 2004, two years after the book was published, Peter Culicover wrote:

The Cambridge grammar of the English language (CGEL) is a monumentally impressive piece of work. Already published reviews of this work do not overstate its virtues: 'a notable achievement'; 'authoritative, interesting, reasonably priced (for a book of this size), beautifully designed, well proofread, and enjoyable to handle'; 'superbly produced and designed'; 'one of the most superb works of academic scholarship ever to appear on the English linguistics scene ... a monumental work that offers easily the most comprehensive and thought-provoking treatment of English grammar to date. Nothing rivals this work, with respect to breadth, depth and consistency of coverage'. I fully agree with these sentiments. Huddleston, Pullum, and collaborators definitely deserve a prize for this achievement.

The book won the Leonard Bloomfield Book Award of the Linguistic Society of America in 2004.

== Derivative works ==
A much simpler distillation by Huddleston and Pullum, titled A Student's Introduction to English Grammar, was published in 2005. As a textbook, it differs from the original work in having exercises for students.

A second, extensively revised edition of A Student's Introduction, with Brett Reynolds as coauthor, came out in 2022.

== See also ==
- A Comprehensive Grammar of the English Language
- Longman Grammar of Spoken and Written English
- The Cambridge History of the English Language
