= Frank R. Palmer =

British linguist (1922–2019)

- Born: Frank Robert Palmer; 9 April 1922
- Died: 1 November 2019 (aged 97)

Academic background
- Education: New College, Oxford
- Influences: John Rupert Firth

Academic work
- Discipline: Linguist
- Institutions: School of Oriental and African Studies; University College, Bangor; University of Reading
- Main interests: Systemic functional linguistics; Mood and modality; Languages of Ethiopia

Frank Robert Palmer (9 April 1922 – 1 November 2019) was a British linguist who was instrumental in the development of the Department of Linguistic Science at the University of Reading.

== Academic career ==
As a child, Palmer lived with his parents in Kendleshire (South Gloucestershire). Palmer took his first school lessons at the Hambrook School (Hambrook), enrolling there on 30 August 1926, as recorded in the Admission Register 1922–1946. On 2 September 1932, he went to Bristol Grammar School. Later, Palmer was educated at New College, Oxford.

In the 1940s, Palmer was a member of the British Army, where he attained the military rank of Lieutenant. After the end of World War II, Palmer became a member of the teaching staff at the School of Oriental and African Studies in London, with a post of Lecturer from 1950 to 1960. John Rupert Firth was the Head of Department at the time and encouraged there a number of his disciples and colleagues, many who later became well known linguists, to carry out research on a number of African and Oriental languages. Under his leadership, Palmer worked on Ethiopean languages, T.F. Mitchell on Arabic and Berber languages, Michael Halliday on Chinese, and Richard Keith Sprigg on the phonology of Asian languages.

In 1952, Palmer travelled in Ethiopia for one year carrying out fieldwork in the local languages. His scientific interests had been the Ethiopian languages for instance Tigre, Bilin, Amharic languages, and the language of the Agaw people from the group of the Cushitic languages.

Palmer became Professor of Linguistics at University College, Bangor, in 1960. In 1965, he and a number of Bangor colleagues moved to the University of Reading to establish the Department of Linguistic Science. Palmer was appointed Professor of Linguistic Science and under his headship the department quickly developed an international reputation.

In 1955, he was inducted into the Linguistic Society of America. In 1971, Palmer was appointed one of the Professorship Holders of the Linguistic Society of America. In 1975, he was made a Fellow of the British Academy, and later of the Academia Europaea. He retired in 1987 with the title of Emeritus Professor of Linguistic Science.

Palmer was the editor of the Journal of Linguistics from 1969 until 1979. He enjoyed a worldwide reputation and consequently travelled widely in North and South America, Asia, North Africa, and Europe. In 1981, he was a visiting lecturer at the Beijing Foreign Studies University.

He was one of the contributors to The Cambridge Grammar of the English Language.

== Palmer's Mood and Modality ==
Palmer treated modality in language or languages generally. In his book Mood and Modality, first published in 1986, Palmer developed a typological study of modality or mood. Another publication Modality and the English Modals had already appeared in 1979. Palmer pointed out the current interest in mood and modality, as well as in grammatical typology in general.

=== Classification of modality in modal systems ===
Modality can be classified as Propositional Modality and Event Modality. Propositional Modality can be further subdivided into

- Epistemic Modality and
- Evidential Modality.

Event Modality in turn can be of two types:

- Deontic Modality and
- Dynamic Modality.

In Deontic Modality, the conditioning factors are external to the relevant individual or speaker, whereas with Dynamic Modality they are internal.

== Partial list of written works ==
- The broken plurals of Tigrinya.(1955)
- Palmer, F. R (1958). "Comparative Statement and Ethiopian Semitic". Transactions of the Philological Society. 57 (1): 119–43. doi:10.1111/j.1467-968X.1958.tb01275.x.
- The noun in Bilin. Bulletin of the School of Oriental and African Studies (1958) 21:376–391.
- An outline of Bilin phonology. In: Atti del Convegno Internazionale di Studi Etiopici (Roma 2–4 April 1959). Accademia Nazionale dei Lincei, Rom, p. 109–116.
- The Verb Classes of Agaw (Awiya). In: Mitteilungen des Instituts für Orientforschung. Berlin (1959) 7,2, p. 270–297.
- The derived forms of the Tigrinya verb. (1960)
- The Morphology of the Tigre Noun. (= London oriental series. 13). Routledge Curzon, 1962, OCLC 4320882.
- Bilin “to be” and “to have”. In: African Language Studies. (1965) 6, p. 101–111.
- Word classes in Bilin. In: Lingua. (1966) 17(1–2), p. 200–209.
- Affinity and genetic relationship in two Cushitic languages. In: To honour Roman Jakobson: essays on the occasion of his seventieth birthday. The Hague & Paris : Mouton & Co.., pp. 1489–1496., (1967)
- Some remarks on the grammar and phonology of the 'compound verbs' in Cushitic and Ethiopian Semitic. Roma : Accademia Nazionale dei Lincei, Problemi attuali di scienza e di cultura, quaderno n. 191, . pp. 71–77 (1974)
- Palmer, F. R (1977). "Modals and actuality". Journal of Linguistics. 13 (1): 1–23. doi:10.1017/S002222670000517X. JSTOR 4175373. S2CID 144028494.
- Modality and the English Modals. Longman, London (1979), ISBN 0-582-03486-8.
- Semantics, Cambridge University Press, Cambridge (1981), ISBN 0-521-28376-0
- Mood and Modality. Cambridge University Press, Cambridge (1986), ISBN 0-521-31930-7.
- Studies in the history of linguistic science: a festschrift for Robert H. Robins. Frank R. Palmer together with Theodora Bynon (eds.) Cambridge University Press, (1986).
- The English Verb. Longman Linguistics Library, (1988), ISBN 0-582-29714-1.
- Literature and Moral Understanding: Philosophical Essay on Ethics, Aesthetics, Education and Culture. Oxford University Press, (1992), ISBN 0-19-824232-8.
- Grammatical Roles and Relations. Cambridge Textbooks in Linguistics, Cambridge University Press, (2008), ISBN 978-0-521-45836-8.
- Frank R. Palmer: Lexical aspect in English. Selected Papers from the 18th ISTAL, 2009, p. 1–15
