= Barbara Scholz =

American philosopher of science (1947–2011)

- Born: August 29, 1947; Troy, Ohio, United States
- Died: May 14, 2011 (aged 63); Edinburgh, Scotland
- Occupation: Philosopher
- Spouse: Geoffrey K. Pullum (m. 1994–2011)
- Awards: Fellow of the Radcliffe Institute for Advanced Study (2005–2006)

Academic background
- Education: Urbana College; Andover Newton Theological School; Ohio State University; University of Edinburgh
- Thesis: Kripke's Wittgensteinian paradox (1990)
- Doctoral advisor: Stewart Shapiro

Academic work
- Discipline: Philosophy of science
- Institutions: University of Toledo; University of California, Santa Cruz; San Jose State University

Barbara Caroline Scholz (August 29, 1947 – May 14, 2011) was an American philosopher of science, with a particular focus on the philosophy of cognitive science and linguistics. She taught at the University of Toledo, at the University of California, Santa Cruz, and at San Jose State University. She was a fellow of the Radcliffe Institute for Advanced Study at Harvard University in 2005–2006. From 1994 until her death in 2011, she was married to linguist Geoff Pullum.

== Early life and education ==
Barbara Scholz was born on August 29, 1947, in Troy, Ohio.

Throughout her education, she obtained five degrees in various fields. Scholz earned a B.A. in Philosophy and Religion from Urbana College in 1973, followed by an M.Div. from Andover Newton Theological School in 1976. She taught community college courses in Columbus, Ohio, before deciding to focus on philosophy. Scholz went on to receive an M.A. (1985) and Ph.D. (1990) from Ohio State University, where Stewart Shapiro was her primary doctoral adviser. During her Ph.D. studies, she also completed an M.Sc. in Cognitive Science from the University of Edinburgh in 1988.

== Career ==
Barbara Scholz accepted a tenure-track position at the University of Toledo in 1989. Later, she relocated to California and taught philosophy part-time at De Anza College and UC Santa Cruz, before obtaining a more permanent position at San Jose State University. Scholz's areas of expertise included logic, philosophy of linguistics, ethics, aesthetics, philosophy of biology, and philosophy of religion.

In 2004, Scholz, Geoff Pullum, and James Rogers initiated a group project on the applications of model theory in syntax, which was supported by the Radcliffe Institute for Advanced Study at Harvard University in 2005–2006. However, due to contractual complications with San Jose State, Scholz decided to leave the university and continue her work at Harvard.

In 2007, Scholz and Pullum moved to Edinburgh, where she took up a position in the School of Philosophy, Psychology and Language Sciences at the University of Edinburgh.

== Views ==
Scholz was an atheist and philosophical naturalist.

== Personal life ==
"In her second year someone stole and distributed some love letters of hers, outing her as a lesbian, and she was ostracized within the school's community." Scholz was introduced to Pullum by Arnold Zwicky, and they were married in 1994 in Santa Cruz, California. In December 2010, Scholz was diagnosed with metastasized and inoperable terminal cancer.

== Selected publications ==
- Scholz, Barbara C. (1994). Rescuing the institutional theory of art. Journal of Aesthetics and Art Criticism 52 (1994), 309–325.
- Pullum, Geoffrey K. and Barbara C. Scholz (2002). Empirical assessment of stimulus poverty arguments. The Linguistic Review 19, 9–50.
- Scholz, Barbara C. and Geoffrey K. Pullum (2002). Searching for an argument for linguistic nativism. (A reply to six critical commentary articles on `Empirical assessment of stimulus poverty arguments'.) The Linguistic Review 19, nos. 1–2, 185–224.
- Scholz, Barbara C.; Francis Jeffry Pelletier; and Geoffrey K. Pullum (2011). Philosophy of linguistics. In Edward N. Zalta (ed.), The Stanford Encyclopedia of Philosophy, Metaphysics Research Lab, CSLI, Stanford University. Winter 2011 edition (December 21). http://plato.stanford.edu/entries/linguistics/
