= Jane Gardiner =

- Born: Jane Arden; 26 August 1758; Beverley, Yorkshire, England, Kingdom of Great Britain
- Died: 1840 (aged 81–82)
- Occupations: Schoolmistress, grammarian
- Writing career
- Language: English

Jane Arden Gardiner (1758–1840) was an English schoolmistress and grammarian, and one of the earliest friends of Mary Wollstonecraft.

== Early life ==
Gardiner was the daughter of John Arden, scholar and lecturer, best known as one of Mary Wollstonecraft’s early teachers. His interests centred on natural philosophy (science) and belles lettres (literature); he taught his daughter in moments of leisure. Gardiner herself was friends with Wollstonecraft: they lived near one another in Beverley for several years, and when the Wollstonecraft family moved away in 1774, the girls wrote letters to one another throughout their teens and early twenties.

== Career ==
Gardiner began teaching early, leaving home in her mid-teens to take up a position as governess to the daughters of Lady Martin in north Norfolk. In 1780 she moved across England to the household of Lord Ilchester of Redlynch, Somerset. She was succeeded as governess to the Fox-Strangeways family by Agnes Porter, whose memoirs were reprinted in 1998.

Gardiner opened a boarding school for girls in Beverley in 1784, which she directed by herself for thirteen years. This establishment provided a home for her aging parents and invalid younger sister. By this point she had reconciled herself to her fate: "I own that the life of a governess would not have been my choice, but I am content." Not all governesses were oppressed and isolated; she says on a return visit that the Martin family treated her "more as a daughter than as an humble 'gouvernante'". She went with the Martins to Houghton Hall, then in the possession of Horace Walpole, admiring the famous collection of paintings there. She became acquainted with Nelson, and asked him to help improve her understanding of art.

Her father died in 1791. She married a friend of her younger brother in 1797, and in 1800 they moved, with her pupils, to Elsham Hall, a country house near Elsham, North Lincolnshire. She continued managing her school for thirty more years after that. She accumulated a library for the benefit of her pupils, totalling 2800 volumes in English, French, and Italian. In 1814 the family and school moved to Ashby Hall. In 1836, its owner wanted to take occupancy of the house, so aged 78, Gardiner gave up her school, and died four years later.

== Writing ==
Gardiner was the author of several educational texts. In 1799 she published her Young Ladies’ Grammar, an unusual grammar that used French as a model for English grammar. (for context, see History of English grammars.) In 1801 she published two accompanying volumes called English Exercises. She followed these with a travelogue entitled An Excursion from London to Dover, in Two Volumes (1806), and another grammar called An Easy French Grammar (1808).

== Personal life ==
Gardiner was a devout Christian. She read the Bible daily, in tandem with Scott's Commentary, and the Golden Treasury by Karl Heinrich von Bogatzky. Most of the diary entries reprinted by her daughter are taken up with religious reflections. One of her former pupils claimed that "out of no school was there ever sent forth a greater number of solidly educated christian women" This would have been about 600 young women, over the course of half a century.

Gardiner named her daughter Everilda, the given name of her first employer, Lady Martin. This daughter wrote a somewhat hagiographic memoir of her mother, which this article draws on. It quotes extensively from letters received and diary entries, as well as giving a biographical sketch and an extended description of her last illness and deathbed. The book was funded by subscription publishing, an early version of crowdfunding, and Everilda expressed surprise that almost 700 individuals had "subscribed" (pre-purchased) about 1400 copies.
