= John Rupert Firth =

English linguist (1890–1960)

John Rupert Firth OBE
- Born: 17 June 1890; Keighley, Yorkshire, UK
- Died: 14 December 1960 (aged 70); Lindfield, West Sussex, UK

Academic background
- Education: University of Leeds

Academic work
- Institutions: City of Leeds Training College; University of the Punjab; University College London; SOAS University of London

John Rupert Firth OBE (17 June 1890 in Keighley, Yorkshire – 14 December 1960 in Lindfield, West Sussex), commonly known as J. R. Firth, was an English linguist and a leading figure in British linguistics during the 1950s.

== Education and career ==
Firth studied history at University of Leeds, graduating with a BA degree in 1911 and an MA in 1913. He taught history at the City of Leeds Training College before World War I broke out. He joined the Indian Education Service during 1914–1918. He was Professor of English at the University of the Punjab from 1919 to 1928. He then worked in the phonetics department of University College London before moving to the School of Oriental and African Studies (SOAS), where he became Professor of General Linguistics, a position he held until his retirement in 1956.

In July 1941, before the outbreak of war with Japan, Firth attended a conference on the training of Japanese interpreters and translators and began to think of how intensive courses might be devised. By the summer of 1942, he had devised a method of training people rapidly in how to eavesdrop on Japanese conversations (for example, between pilots and ground control) and to interpret what they heard. The first course began on 12 October 1942 and was for RAF personnel. He had used captured Japanese code books and other such material to draw up a list of essential military vocabulary and had arranged for two Japanese teachers at SOAS (one had been interned on the Isle of Man but had volunteered to teach, while the other was a Canadian-Japanese) to record sentences in which these words might be used. Trainees listened through headphones to recordings containing expressions such as 'Bakugeki junbi taikei tsukure' (Take up formation for bombing). At the end of each course, he sent a report to Bletchley Park commenting on the abilities of each trainee. The trainees were mostly posted to India and played a vital role during the long Burma Campaign giving warning of bombing raids, and a few of them were undertaking similar duties on ships of the Royal Navy during the last year of the war. For his work during the war, he was awarded an OBE in 1945.

== Contributions to linguistics ==
His work on prosody, which he emphasised at the expense of the phonemic principle, prefigured later work in autosegmental phonology. Firth is noted for drawing attention to the context-dependent nature of meaning with his notion of 'context of situation', and his work on collocational meaning is widely acknowledged in the field of distributional semantics. In particular, he is known for the famous quotation:

You shall know a word by the company it keeps (Firth, J. R. 1957:11)

Firth developed a particular view of linguistics that has given rise to the adjective "Firthian". Central to this view is the idea of polysystematism. David Crystal describes this as:

... an approach to linguistic analysis based on the view that language patterns cannot be accounted for in terms of a single system of analytic principles and categories ... but that different systems may need to be set up at different places within a given level of description.

His approach can be considered as resuming that of Malinowski's anthropological semantics, and as a precursor of the approach of semiotic anthropology. Anthropological semantics is an approach which may be adopted instead of, or as a complement to, the other major currents within the field of semantics (viz., linguistic semantics, logical semantics, and General Semantics). Other independent approaches to semantics are philosophical semantics and psychological semantics.

Firth's theory that "you shall know a word by the company it keeps" / "a word is characterized by the company it keeps" inspired works on word embedding hence had a major impact in natural language processing. Many techniques were designed to build dense vectors representing words semantics based on their neighbors (e.g., Word2vec, GloVe).

== The "London School" ==
As a teacher in the University of London for more than 20 years, Firth influenced a generation of British linguists. The popularity of his ideas among contemporaries gave rise to what was known as the 'London School' of linguistics. Among Firth's students, the so-called neo-Firthians were exemplified by Michael Halliday, who was Professor of General Linguistics in the University of London from 1965 until 1971.

Firth encouraged a number of his students, who later became well-known linguists, to carry out research on a number of African and Oriental languages. T. F. Mitchell worked on Arabic and Berber, Frank R. Palmer on Ethiopian languages, including Tigre, and Michael Halliday on Chinese. Some other students whose native tongues were not English also worked with him and that enriched Firth's theory on prosodic analysis. Among his influential students were Masud Husain Khan and the Arab linguists Ibrahim Anis, Tammam Hassan and Kamal Bashir. Firth got many insights from work done by his students in Semitic and Oriental languages so he made a great departure from the linear analysis of phonology and morphology to a more of syntagmatic and paradigmatic analysis, where it is important to distinguish between the two levels of phonematic units (equivalent to phone) and prosodies (equivalent to features like "nasalization", "velarization", etc.). Prosodic analysis paved the way to autosegmental phonology, though many linguists, who do not have a good background on the history of phonology, do not acknowledge this.

== Selected publications ==
- Speech. London: Ernest Benn, 1930.
- The Tongues of Men. London: Watts, 1937.
- Papers in Linguistics, 1934–1951. London: Oxford University Press, 1957.
- A synopsis of linguistic theory 1930-1955, in J. R. Firth, editor, Studies in Linguistic Analysis, Special volume of the Philological Society, chapter 1, pages 1–32, Oxford: Blackwell, 1957.
- Selected Papers of J. R. Firth, 1952-59, edited by F. R. Palmer. London: Longmans, 1968.

== See also ==
- Phonaestheme
- Systemic linguistics
