= Karl Heinrich von Bogatzky =

German hymn writer (1690–1774)

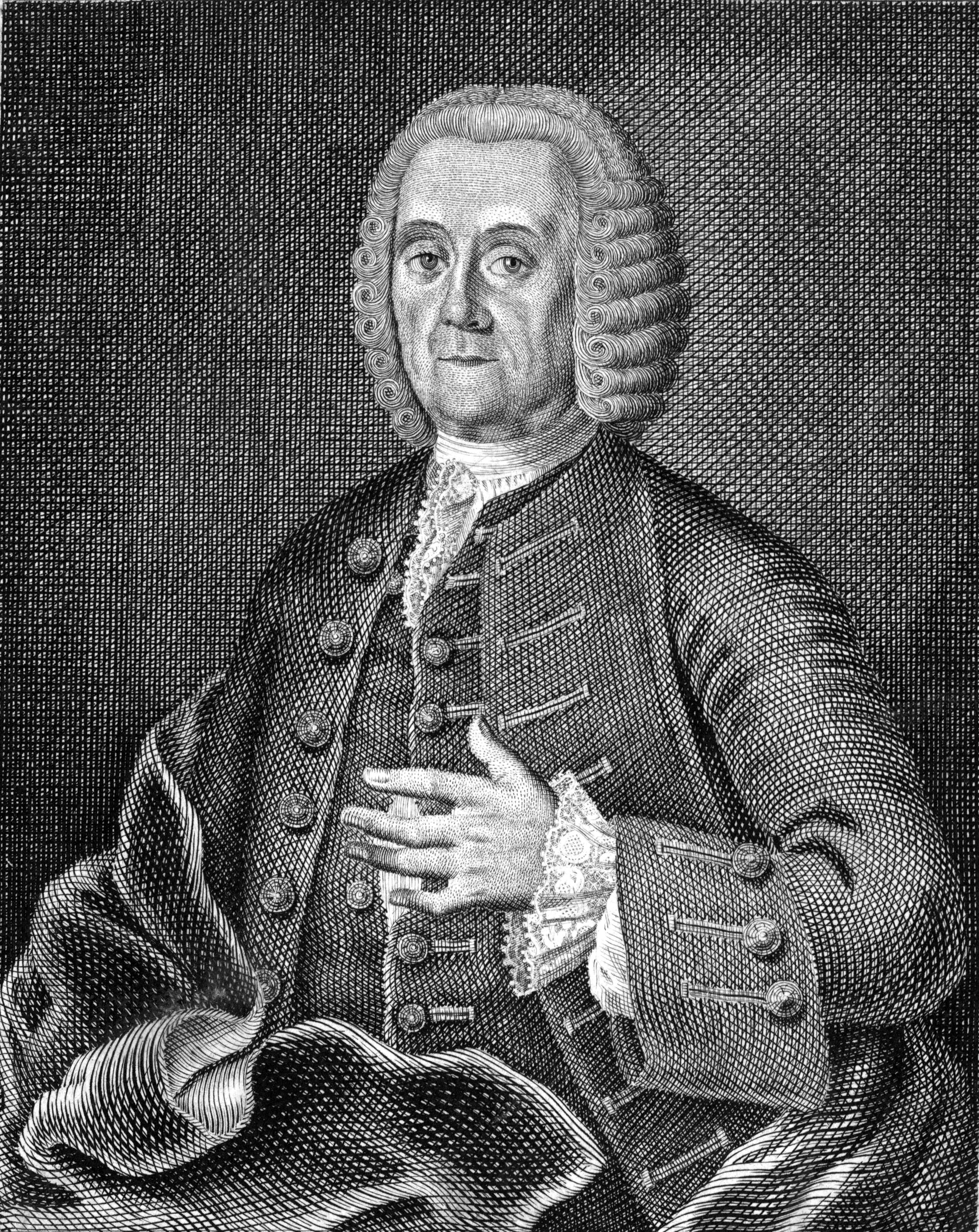
- Karl Heinrich von Bogatzky
- Born: 7 September 1690; Jankowe, Silesia
- Died: 15 June 1774 (aged 83)
- Occupation: German hymnwriter

Karl Heinrich von Bogatzky (Jankowe, Silesia 7 September 1690 – 15 June 1774) was a German hymn writer.

== Life ==
At first a page at the ducal court of Saxe-Weissenfels, he next studied law and theology at Jena and Halle; but ill health prevented his preferment. He settled at Glaucha in Silesia, now part of Halle, where he founded an orphanage. After living for a time at Köstritz, and from 1740 to 1745 at the court of Christian Ernst, duke of Saxe-Coburg, at Saalfeld, he made his home at the Waisenhaus (orphanage) at Halle, where, until his death, he engaged in spiritual work and in composing hymns and sacred songs.

== Works ==
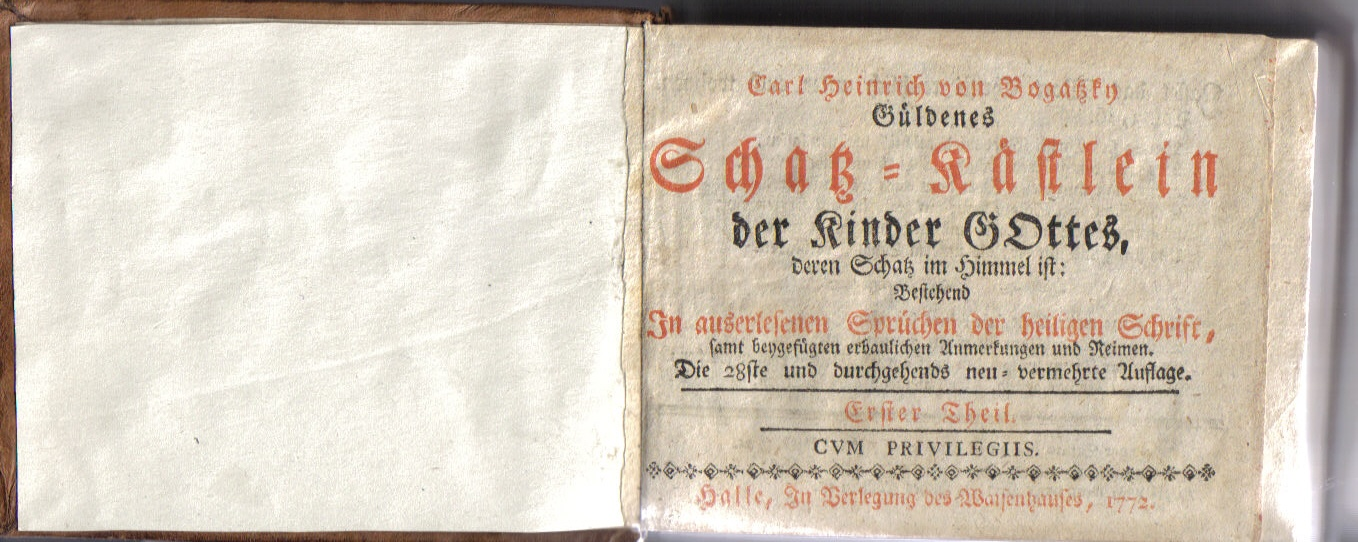
Güldenes Schatz-Kästlein der Kinder Gottes, 28th edition 1772

Bogatzky's main works are Güldenes Schatzkästlein der Kinder Gottes (Little Golden Treasure Chest of God's Children, 1718) and Übung der Gottseligkeit in allerlei geistlichen Liedern (Exercises Regarding God's Blessedness in All Forms of Religious Songs, 1750). He also wrote A Golden Treasury for the Children of God in 1746; this was one of the favourite books of Jane Gardiner (1758–1840), an English school owner.
