= Ellin Devis =

- Born: December 1746; Kingdom of Great Britain
- Died: February 1820 (aged 73)
- Occupations: Educator; Writer

Ellin Devis (December 1746 – February 1820), also known as Eilen Devis or Ellin Davis, was a schoolmistress and author of The Accidence (1775), a popular eighteenth-century grammar.

== Biography ==
Ellin Devis was the daughter of Arthur Devis (1712-1787) and Elizabeth Faulkner (1723-1788), who had a total of twenty-two children, sixteen of whom did not survive their infancy. The surviving six children included Ellin and her siblings Frances Devis (1751-17?), Thomas Anthony Devis (1756-1810), Arthur William Devis (1762-1822), Elizabeth Devis (1764-1825), and Ann Devis (1766-1822). She came from an artistic family: her father Arthur was known for his conversation pieces, her brother Arthur for historical portraits, and her brother Thomas for landscape paintings.

== Career ==
Devis's The Accidence (1775) may have been the first English grammar written specifically for female students. Devis's grammar was recommended by her peers as a general introduction to Robert Lowth’s Short Introduction to English Grammar (1762).

Devis taught at several schools in fashionable areas of London, and her pupils include Maria Edgeworth, Frances Burney and her sister Susannah, Hester Thrale and later her daughter Cecilia Piozzi. While Devis was mistress of the Queen’s Square school in Bloomsbury, England, it was known as “the Young Ladies Eton.” Devis's unique teaching style was successful, and at the time of her death in 1820, she had earned enough to own the school.

== Works ==
- The Accidence or First Rudiments of English Grammar Designed for the use of Young Ladies (1775)
- Miscellaneous lessons: designed for the use of young ladies (1782)
- The Infant's Miscellany (1778)
