= Gregory Ward =

American academic, linguist and researcher (born 1955)

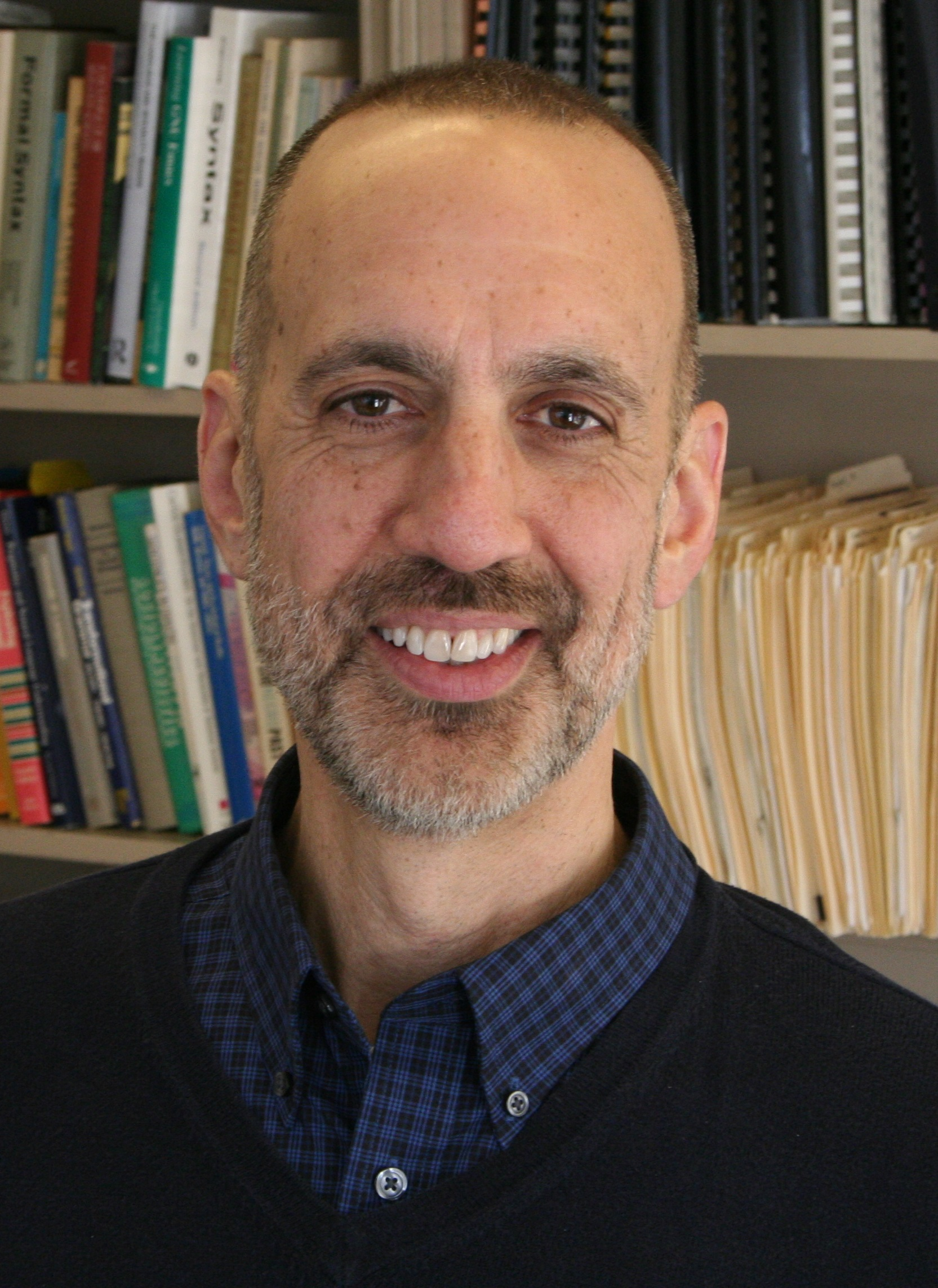
- Born: October 8, 1955 (age 71)
- Occupations: Linguist, academic and researcher

Academic background
- Education: B.A. in Linguistics; Ph.D. in Linguistics
- Alma mater: University of California, Berkeley; University of Pennsylvania
- Thesis: The Semantics and Pragmatics of Preposing
- Website: https://www.gregoryward.org/

Gregory Ward is an American linguist, academic and researcher. He is Professor of Linguistics, Gender & Sexuality Studies and, by courtesy, Philosophy at Northwestern University.

Ward's primary research revolves around pragmatics, with emphasis on the pragmatic meaning associated with particular syntactic constructions and intonational contours. He is a collaborative author of The Cambridge Grammar of the English Language, has co-authored Information Status and Noncanonical Word Order in English, authored The Semantics and Pragmatics of Preposing, and co-edited Drawing the Boundaries of Meaning: Neo-Gricean Studies in Pragmatics and Semantics in Honor of Laurence R. Horn.

He is a Fellow of the Linguistic Society of America (LSA) and served as its Secretary-Treasurer from 2004 - 2007.

== Education ==
Ward received his B.A. degree in Linguistics and Comparative Literature [with honors] from the University of California, Berkeley in 1978. He earned his Ph.D. in linguistics from the University of Pennsylvania in 1985 under the supervision of Ellen F. Prince.

== Career ==
Ward joined San Diego State University’s Department of Linguistics as a lecturer in 1985. In the following year, he joined Northwestern University as an assistant professor of linguistics. He was promoted to associate professor in 1991 and to Professor of Linguistics in 1997.

Ward chaired the Department of Linguistics at Northwestern University from 1999 to 2004 and served as co-director of the Sexualities Project at Northwestern (SPAN) from 2018 to 2024.

== Research ==
Ward has conducted research in the area of pragmatics, focusing on pragmatic theory, information structure, intonational meaning, and reference. He has focused on pragmatic meaning associated with particular syntactic constructions and intonational contours. His later research investigates demonstratives, event anaphora, functional compositionality, and the semantics-pragmatics boundary.

=== Intonational contours ===
With Julia Hirschberg, Ward has researched the pragmatics of fall-rise intonation and introduced two conditions for its felicitous use. He found that the fall-rise intonational contour contributed pragmatically to the utterance interpretation by conveying speaker uncertainty. Also with Hirschberg, he has worked on a series of utterance pairs and investigated the effect of pitch range, duration, amplitude and spectral features, regarding the interpretation of rise-fall-rise intonational contour. Their study indicated pitch range as having a main effect on interpretation selection.

=== Semantics and pragmatics ===
With Hirschberg, Ward conducted pragmatic analyses of tautological utterances. They critically analyzed the 'radical semantics' approach to tautology and proposed instead a new Gricean account of tautological utterances. With collaborator Richard Sproat, he applied psycholinguistic experiments to support the view that outbound anaphora is grammatical and its felicity determined by pragmatic principles. Ward's research also identified various pragmatic and morphosyntactic factors that affected the accessibility of discourse entities.

Ward has explored various syntactic prominence effects on discourse processes and proposed that the interpretation of a text is partly determined by syntactic structures affecting the relative prominence of the concepts evoked by the text. He also highlighted the effect of concepts placed in syntactically prominent positions on text processing and short-term memory accessibility.

=== Information structure ===
Ward has focused on the interface between syntactic structure and information structure, exploring possible generalizations between specific non-canonical word orders and information‐structural constraints regarding their usage. With Betty Birner, he highlighted various classes of word orders (in English and other languages) in the context of their information‐status constraints.

=== Anaphora/reference ===
Ward and Hirschberg have also studied the role of structural constraints on anaphoric binding, based on psycholinguistic studies regarding interpretation of bound anaphors. They found that the interpretation of reflexive and non-reflexive anaphors is influenced by the pitch accent. With Ryan Doran, he has proposed a comprehensive taxonomy of the various uses of demonstratives in English.

== Awards and honors ==
- 2009 - Named Fellow of the Linguistic Society of America.
- 2012 - Recipient of the E. LeRoy Hall Award for Excellence in Teaching in the Weinberg College of Arts and Sciences at Northwestern University

== Bibliography ==
=== Books ===
- Information Status and Noncanonical Word Order in English (1998) ISBN 978-9027230430
- Drawing the Boundaries of Meaning: Neo-Gricean Studies in Pragmatics and Semantics in Honor of Laurence R. Horn (2006) ISBN 978-9027230904
- The Handbook of Pragmatics (2008) ISBN 978-0470756713
- The Semantics and Pragmatics of Preposing (2016) ISBN 978-1134992973

=== Selected articles ===
- 1985 Ward, Gregory and Julia Hirschberg. "Implicating Uncertainty: The Pragmatics of Fall-Rise Intonation," in Language 61:747-776.
- 1991 Ward, Gregory, Richard Sproat, and Gail McKoon. "A Pragmatic Analysis of So-Called Anaphoric Islands," in Language 67:439-474.
- 1992 Hirschberg, Julia and Gregory Ward. "The Influence of Pitch Range, Duration, Amplitude and Spectral Features on the Interpretation of the Rise-Fall-Rise Intonation Contour in English," in Journal of Phonetics 20:241-251.
- 1994 Birner, Betty J. and Gregory Ward. "Uniqueness, Familiarity, and the Definite Article in English," in Proceedings of the Twentieth Annual Meeting of the Berkeley Linguistics Society, 93–102. Berkeley, CA: Berkeley Linguistics Society.
- 1995 Ward, Gregory and Betty J. Birner. "Definiteness and the English Existential," in Language 71:722-742.
- 2007 Birner, Betty J., Jeffrey P. Kaplan, and Gregory Ward. "Functional Compositionality and the Interaction of Discourse Constraints," in Language 83:323-349.
- 2012 Doran, Ryan B., Gregory Ward, Meredith Larson, Yaron McNabb, and Rachel E. Baker. "A Novel Experimental Paradigm for Distinguishing Between ‘What is Said’ and 'What is Implicated'," in Language 88:124-154.
- 2019 Doran, Ryan B. and Gregory Ward. "A Taxonomy of Uses of Demonstratives," in The Oxford Handbook of Reference, edited by Barbara Abbott and Jeanette Gundel. Oxford: Oxford University Press. pp. 236–259.
