= Desmond C. Derbyshire =

Desmond Derbyshire
- Born: September 10, 1924; Durham, England
- Died: December 19, 2007 (aged 83)
- Occupation: Linguist

Academic work
- Discipline: Linguist, Missionary Translator
- Sub-discipline: Cariban languages

Desmond Cyril Derbyshire (10 September 1924 – 19 December 2007) was a linguist who specialized in Carib languages.

== Background ==
He is best known for his work on Hixkaryana, known for its object–verb–subject word order. Derbyshire's study of the language (as a linguist with the Summer Institute of Linguistics) resulted in the first description in the linguistics literature of a language with this word order as its default.

The most surprising story Derbyshire told of the long period of work in the Hixkaryana village of remote northern Brazil concerned a day in November 1965, during the visit by then New York's US Senator Robert F. Kennedy. The recounting of that three-day visit included how Senator Kennedy declared his decision to run for President of the United States.
