= John Hart (spelling reformer) =

English educator and spelling reformer (died 1574)

John Hart (died 1574) was an English educator, grammarian, spelling reformer and officer of arms. He is best known for proposing a reformed spelling system for English, which has been described as "the first truly phonological scheme" in the history of early English spelling. As an officer of arms, John Hart held the title of Chester Herald between 1567 and 1574.

== Spelling reform ==
Hart is the author of three known works on grammar and spelling: an unpublished manuscript from 1551 titled The Opening of the Unreasonable Writing of Our Inglish Toung; a printed pamphlet titled An Orthographie, published in 1569; and a practical reading primer titled A Methode or Comfortable Beginning for All Unlearned, published in 1570. In these works, he criticises the contemporary spelling practices of his day as chaotic and illogical, and argues for a radically reformed orthography on purely phonological principles. His goal was to introduce a spelling system with a one-to-one relationship between sounds and symbols ("to vse as many letters in our writing, as we doe voyces or breathes in speaking, and no more "). For this purpose, he introduced six new phonetic consonant symbols for the sounds ð, θ, tʃ, dʒ, ʃ and syllabic l, as well as a system of diacritics for vowels. Long vowels were systematically marked by a dot below the letter, while the reduced vowel schwa was marked by ë.

Hart's proposed symbols
Hart's symbol	Wikisource approximation	Traditional spelling (most common/reliable)	Phonetic value
(like d with top loop or upside-down ȡ)	∂	th	/ð/
(like a digraph of fᴕ)	†	th	/θ/
(like more curly 𝼏 or a digraph of ʗơ joined at the bottom)	ɕ	ch	/tʃ/
(like ᵹ with follow-through stroke)	ᵹ	soft g	/dʒ/
(like ʆ with upstroke)	ʆ	sh	/ʃ/
(like backwards ȴ, ʝ without tittle or longer Ʝ with upstroke)	l	-le	/l̩/
ạ	ạ	-a...e	/aː/ (modern /eɪ/)
ẹ	ẹ	ee	/eː/ (modern /iː/)
ë	ë	-a	/ə/
ị	ị	-i...e	/iː/ (modern /aɪ/)
ọ	ọ	-o...e	/oː/ (modern /oʊ/)
ụ	ụ	-u...e	/uː/

=== Historical relevance ===
Hart's work has been lauded by modern linguists for his highly insightful phonetic analysis of the Early Modern English of his days, and for his thoroughness in pursuing the phonetic principle. His discussion of vowel pronunciations is particularly interesting to historians of the English language, because it documents the spoken English at an intermediate point during the Great Vowel Shift, which during Hart's days was radically transforming the vowel system of English. Thus, for instance, Hart documents that the pronunciation of words that had Middle English long /iː/ but shifted to /aɪ/ in Modern English was still variable in his days, with some speakers retaining /iː/ in some words, but a diphthong /ɛɪ/ (spelled ei by Hart) already common in others.

=== Example ===
The following passage from Hart's Orthographie, in his original spelling, illustrates the system. (For technical reasons, Hart's six new consonant symbols have here been replaced by their equivalent modern IPA symbols.)

An exersịz ov ðat huiʧ iz sẹd:
huer-in iz declared, hou ðe rest ov ðe consonants ar mad bei ðinstruments ov ðe mouθ:
huiʧ uaz omited in ðe premisez, for ðat ui did not muʧ abiuz ðem.
Cap. vii.

In ðis tịtl̩ abuv-uritn, ei konsider ov ðe ị, in exersịz, & ov ðe u, in instruments: ðe leik ov ðe ị, in tịtl̩, huiʧ ðe kómon man, and mani lernd, dụ sound in ðe diphθongs ei, and iu: iet ei uld not θink it mịt to ureit ðem, in ðọz and leik ụrds, huẹr ðe sound ov ðe voël ọnli, mẹ bi as uel álouëd in our spịʧ, as ðat ov ðe diphθong iuzd ov ðe riud: and so fár ei álou observasion for derivasions. ~ /hierbei iu mẹ persẹv, ðat our singl̩ sounding and ius of letters, mẹ in proses ov teim, bring our họl nasion tu ọn serten, perfet and ʒeneral spẹking. ~ /huer-in ʃi must bi rịuled bei ðe lernd from teim tu teim.~

— John Hart, An Orthographie, ch.7

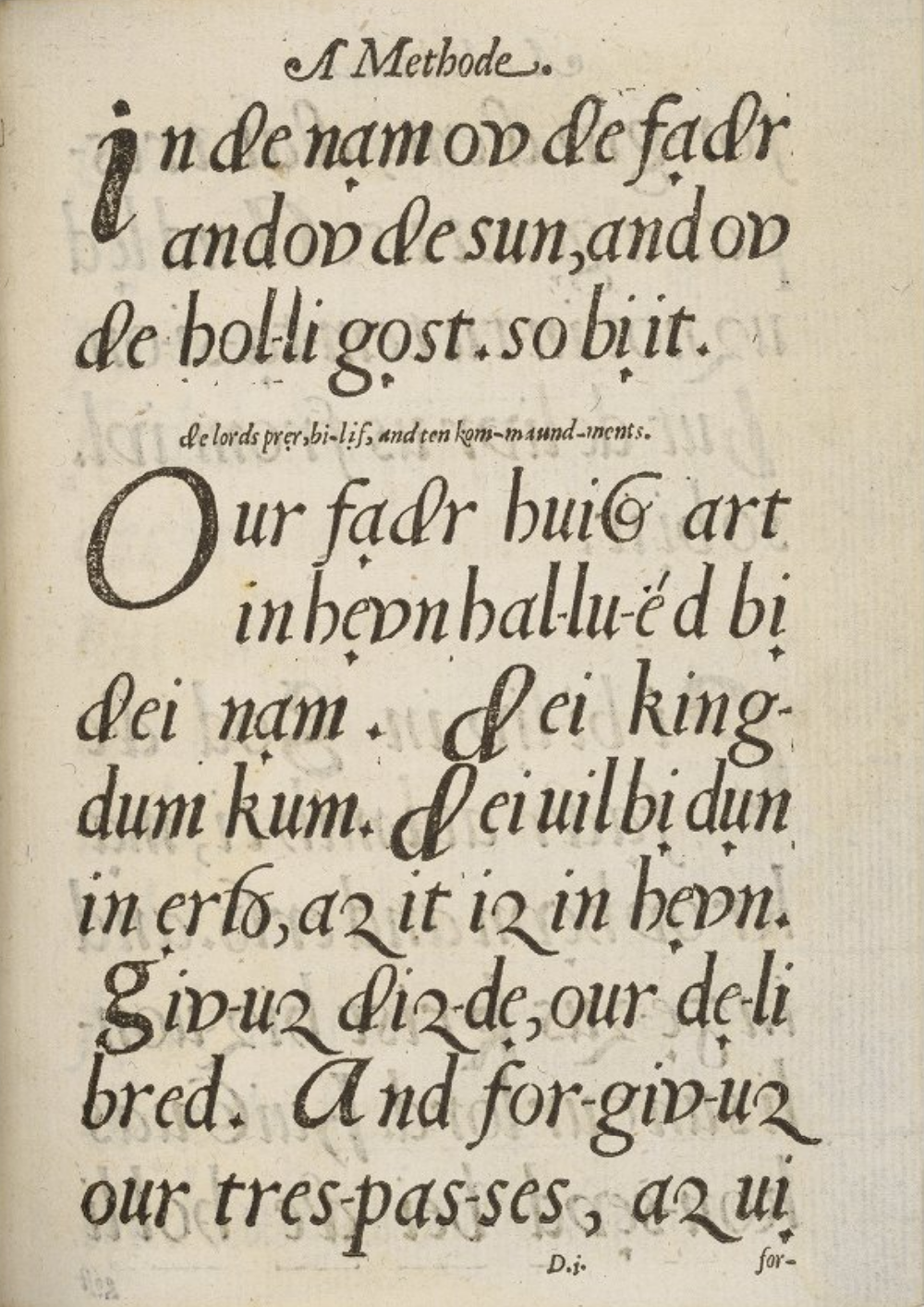
Page from A Methode, 1570
