= Stig Johansson (linguist) =

Swedish-Norwegian linguist (1939–2010)

Stig Johansson (21 February 1939 – 22 April 2010) was a Swedish-Norwegian linguist.

He was born in Traryd in Småland, Sweden. He received his PhD in linguistics from Indiana University in 1968 and then worked at the universities of Lund and Gothenburg in Sweden before being hired as an associate professor at the University of Oslo in 1976. He remained there until his retirement in 2008, serving as a full professor from 1982. He was inducted into the Norwegian Academy of Science and Letters in 1991, and received an honorary degree from Lund University in 1999.

Stig Johansson's research interests included English grammar, contrastive analysis and learner language analysis. He made a lasting contribution to the field of corpus linguistics, both monolingual and mulitilingual. In addition to his many scholarly publications, he also co-authored several textbooks within English phonetics and grammar.

Stig Johansson was one of the founders of ICAME, the International Computer Archive of Modern and Medieval English, in 1977, and was the organization's first general secretary. Stig Johansson was instrumental in compiling corpora and thereby developing the field of corpus linguistics. Most prominent among the corpora he compiled are the LOB (Lancaster-Oslo-Bergen) corpus, in collaboration with Geoffrey Leech, and the English-Norwegian Parallel Corpus (ENPC), which contributed vitally to establishing the field of corpus-based contrastive linguistics. The Oslo Multilingual Corpus (OMC) was first conceived as an extension of the ENPC, and the work was directed by Stig Johansson. He also directed the compilation of the Norwegian component of the International Corpus of Learner English (ICLE). Major publications by Stig Johansson include the following:

- Biber, Douglas, Stig Johansson, Geoffrey Leech, Susan Conrad & Edward Finegan (1999). Longman Grammar of Spoken and Written English. Longman.
- Johansson, Stig. (2007). Seeing through Multilingual Corpora. On the Use of Corpora in Contrastive Studies. John Benjamins.
