= Etsko Kruisinga =

Dutch linguistics professor

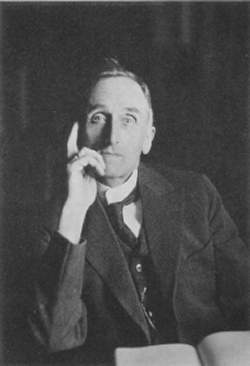
Etsko Kruisinga in the 1930s

Etsko Kruisinga (December 8, 1875 – February 15, 1944) was a Dutch educator and academic. He was internationally recognized as a pioneer in the grammar, spelling, and phonics of the English, Dutch, and German languages. He was also a founder of the educational organization Association of Teachers in Living Languages which is based in the Netherlands.

Today, the Dr. E Kruisinga Fund Foundation named after him is still active, which supports internships for students of the Hague University of Applied Sciences.

== Early career ==
Kruisinga attended high school in Groningen. In 1894, he studied Dutch and English at the University of Groningen. In 1898, Kruisinga attended Oxford University for six months where he met his future wife, whom he married in 1901.

In 1904, he obtained his doctorate and was appointed as a tutor at Utrecht University in 1909.

In 1913, he remarried following the 1911 death of his wife.

Kruisinga became a rector and professor at a school in The Hague in the 1930s. He held these positions until his death in 1944.
