= Longman Grammar of Spoken and Written English =

1999 descriptive grammar of English

- Author: Douglas Biber, Stig Johansson, Geoffrey Leech, Susan Conrad, & Edward Finegan
- Subject: Comprehensive descriptive grammar of the English language
- Publisher: Longman
- Publication date: 1999
- Media type: Print (hardcover)
- Pages: 1204
- ISBN: 9780582237254

Longman Grammar of Spoken and Written English (LGSWE) is a descriptive grammar of English written by Douglas Biber, Stig Johansson, Geoffrey Leech, Susan Conrad, and Edward Finegan, first published by Longman in 1999. It is an authoritative description of modern English, a successor to A Comprehensive Grammar of the English Language (ComGEL) published in 1985 and a predecessor of the Cambridge Grammar of the English Language (CamGEL) published in 2002. The authors and some reviewers consider it a complement rather than a replacement of the former since it follows – with few exceptions (for example in the typology of adverbials) – the grammatical framework and concepts from ComGEL, which is also corroborated by the fact that one of LGSWE's authors, Geoffrey Leech, is also a co-author of ComGEL.

Longman Grammar of Spoken and Written English represents a large-scale corpus-based grammar focussing in its grammatical description of English mainly on "functional interpretation of the quantitative findings" (p. 41). These interpretations and findings are presented consistently throughout the book, with an emphasis on four major registers (functional styles), conversation, fiction, news, and academic prose, occasionally supplemented by examples from two supplementary registers: general prose (non-fiction) and non-conversational speech (e.g. lectures, sermons). Covering both British and American varieties of English in all of these registers but the last one, the descriptions in LGSWE are based on a language corpus exceeding 40 million words and as such this grammar has been widely praised as a new milestone in corpus-based grammatical studies.

While targeting "English language students and researchers" (p. 45), an abridged version of the grammar was released in 2002, Longman Student Grammar of Spoken and Written English, together with a workbook entitled Longman Student Grammar of Spoken and Written English Workbook, to be used by students on university and teacher-training courses.

== Reviews ==
- Görlach, M.: "Review of D. Biber, S. Johansson, G. Leech, S. Conrad and E. Finegan, Longman grammar of spoken and written English (Harlow: Pearson Education, 1999)", Arbeiten aus Anglistik und Amerikanistik 25/2, 2000, pp. 257–260.
- Hirst, G.: Review of 'The Longman Grammar of Spoken and Written English', Computational Linguistics 27/1, 2001, pp. 132–139.
- Krug, M.: "Douglas Biber, Stig Johansson, Geoffrey Leech, Susan Conrad and Edward Finegan, Longman grammar of spoken and written English. London: Longman, 1999. Hardback 9p. xii + 1,204. ISBN 0 582 23725 4.", English Language and Linguistics Volume 6/2, pp. 379–416 .
- Mukherjee, J.: "Corpus linguistics and English reference grammars" in A. Renouf (Ed.): The Changing Face of Corpus Linguistics: Papers from the 24th International Conference on English Language Research on Computerized Corpora (ICAME 24), Amsterdam: Rodopi, pp. 337–354 .
- Parker, F.: "Longman Grammar of Spoken and Written English. By Douglas Biber, Stig Johansson, Geoffrey Leech, Susan Conrad, and Edward Finegan. Essex, England: Pearson Education Ltd., 1999. xxviii + 1204. ISBN 0-58-223725-4", Journal of English Linguistics 31/1, pp. 90–97 .
- Schmid, H.-J.: "Longman Grammar of Spoken and Written English: Review of Douglas Biber, Stig Johannson, Geoffrey Leech, Susan Conrad and Edward Finegan, Pearson Education Limited, Harlow, 1999. xxviii+1204 pages", Journal of Pragmatics 35/8, 2003, pp. 1265–1269 .
- Schneider, E. W.: "Review of "Longman Grammar of Spoken and Written English" by Douglas Biber, Stig Johansson, Geoffrey Leech, Susan Conrad and Edward Finegan", English World-Wide 22/1, 2001, pp. 137–143 .
- Williams, H. "Review. Longman Grammar of Spoken and Written English. D Biber, S Johansson, G Leech, S Conrad, E Finegan", ELT Journal 55/2, 2001, pp. 208–210 .

== See also ==
- A Comprehensive Grammar of the English Language
- The Cambridge Grammar of the English Language
