= Peter Culicover =

American linguist

Peter W. Culicover is Professor of Linguistics at Ohio State University. He works in the areas of syntactic theory (particularly on the syntax of English), language learnability and computational modelling of language acquisition and language change.

== Education ==
Culicover attended the City College of New York and graduated with a BA in mathematics in 1966. He earned his PhD from Massachusetts Institute of Technology in 1971 under Noam Chomsky with a thesis titled Syntactic and semantic investigations.

== Career ==
He worked at Ohio State for the duration of his career, serving as the Chair of the Department of Linguistics, Director of the Center for Cognitive Science, and Associate Provost. He is now the Distinguished University Professor Emeritus of Linguistics.

== Awards ==
Culicover is a winner of Humboldt Prize and the Distinguished Scholar Award of Ohio State University.

== Selected works ==
- English Focus Constructions and the Theory of Grammar (with Michael S. Rochemont; Cambridge University Press, 1990)
- Principles and Parameters: An Introduction to Syntactic Theory (Oxford University Press, 1997)
- Syntactic Nuts: Hard Cases in Syntax (Oxford University Press, 1999)
- Dynamical Grammar (Oxford University Press, 2003)
- (with Ray Jackendoff) Simpler Syntax (Oxford University Press, 2005)
