= Terence Frederick Mitchell =

British linguist (1919–2007)

Terence Frederick Mitchell (3 May 1919 – 1 January 2007), commonly known as T. F. Mitchell, was a British linguist and Professor of Linguistics and Phonetics at the University of Leeds.

== Biography ==
Mitchell was born in Devon and educated at Torquay Boys' Grammar School and University College London from which he graduated with a BA in French and Spanish in 1940. He then served with the Royal Artillery of the British Army in India, Burma and the Middle East until discharged as a Major in 1946.

== Academic career ==
Mitchell's first academic appointment in 1946 was at the School of Oriental and African Studies (SOAS) in London where he worked with Professor J R Firth.

Mitchell remained at SOAS until 1964 when he was appointed Professor of Contemporary English at the University of Leeds. In 1966 his Chair was renamed English Language and General Linguistics. From 1967 to 1970 he was Chairman of the School of English at Leeds. In 1971 the University created a separate Department of Linguistics and Phonetics. Mitchell became Professor and Head of the Department until 1980 when he retired with the title Emeritus Professor.

For fifteen years he was the editor of the periodical Archivum Linguisticum. Mitchell was also the author of Teach Yourself Colloquial Arabic subtitled "the living language of Egypt", first published in 1962.
