= Rodney Huddleston =

British grammarian and linguist

Rodney Desmond Huddleston
- Born: 4 April 1937 (age 89); Bowdon, Cheshire, England
- Citizenship: British; Australian
- Education: Cambridge University (B.A.); University of Edinburgh (PhD)
- Known for: The Cambridge Grammar of the English Language
- Spouses: Joan Mulholland (1965–78); Cheryll Jacklin (1978-1985); Vivienne Pool (1988–)
- Awards: Leonard Bloomfield Book Award (2004; shared with Geoff Pullum); Fellow, Australian Academy of the Humanities, awarded a Personal Chair; 'Excellence in Teaching' award; Centenary Medal for service to Australian society and the humanities in the study of linguistics
- Scientific career
- Workplaces: University of Queensland (1967–1997); University of Reading (1967–1968); University of London (1964–1967, 1968–1969); University of Edinburgh (1963–1964)
- Thesis: Descriptive and comparative analysis of text in French and English (1963)
- Doctoral advisor: Michael Halliday
- Doctoral students: Francis Bond

Rodney D. Huddleston (born 4 April 1937) is a British linguist and grammarian specializing in the study and description of English.

Huddleston is the primary author of The Cambridge Grammar of the English Language (ISBN 0-521-43146-8), which presents a comprehensive descriptive grammar of English.

== Early life and education ==
Huddleston was born in Cheshire, England, and attended Manchester Grammar School. Upon leaving school, he spent two years in the military completing National Service before enrolling at Corpus Christi College, Cambridge, with a scholarship, where he graduated in 1960 with a First Class Honours degree in Modern and Medieval Languages.

After graduating from Cambridge, Huddleston earned his PhD in Applied Linguistics from the University of Edinburgh in 1963 under the supervision of Michael Halliday.

== Academic career ==
Huddleston held lectureships at the University of Edinburgh, University College London, and the University of Reading. In 1969, he moved to the University of Queensland, where he remained for the rest of his career. He was the recipient of the first round of 'Excellence in Teaching' awards at the University of Queensland in 1988. In 1990, he was awarded a Personal Chair. He is currently an emeritus professor at the University of Queensland, where he taught until 1997.

=== Under Halliday ===
For some time, Huddleston ran a project under Halliday in the Communications Research Centre at The University of London called the “OSTI Programme in the Linguistic Properties of Scientific English.” (OSTI was the UK government's Office for Scientific and Technical Information.) As a student of Halliday's, Huddleston was a proponent of Systemic Functional Grammar, but as his thinking developed, he came to reject it.

=== The Cambridge Grammar of the English Language ===
==== Background ====
In 1988, Huddleston published a very critical review of the 1985 book A Comprehensive Grammar of the English Language. He wrote:

[T]here are some respects in which it is seriously flawed and disappointing. A number of quite basic categories and concepts do not seem to have been thought through with sufficient care; this results in a remarkable amount of unclarity and inconsistency in the analysis, and in the organization of the grammar.

A year later, he decided that he would have to produce a grammar that did a better job. He was awarded a special projects grant by The University of Queensland to the project and began work on what was provisionally titled The Cambridge Grammar of English. (Note: The eventual title – whose obvious abbreviation CGEL was already in wide use for A Comprehensive Grammar of the English Language – was imposed by the publisher. Pullum, Geoffrey K. (29 July 2002). "Some points of agreement about the Cambridge Grammar". Linguist List. Archived from the original on 8 March 2023.) From 1989 to 1995, workshops were held two or three times a year in Brisbane and Sydney to develop ideas for the framework and content.

Intellectually, these were intense and exhausting sessions but they were associated with extremely enjoyable social gatherings. In some ways it is the social side of these events that lingers in the memory long after the details of linguistic discussion are forgotten. We remember particularly dawn jogs to Alexandra Beach from Rodney’s house at Sunshine Beach, pool volleyball and table tennis games fought with great ferocity, and walks through Noosa National Park with spectacular sunsets over Noosa Bay.

Geoff Pullum joined the project in 1995, after Huddleston "bemoaned the problems he was having in maintaining the momentum of this huge project, at that time already five years underway".

==== Publication and reception ====
The book was published in 2002. In 2004, Peter Culicover wrote:

The Cambridge grammar of the English language (CGEL) is a monumentally impressive piece of work. Already published reviews of this work do not overstate its virtues: 'a notable achievement'; 'authoritative, interesting, reasonably priced (for a book of this size), beautifully designed, well proofread, and enjoyable to handle'; 'superbly produced and designed'; 'one of the most superb works of academic scholarship ever to appear on the English linguistics scene ... a monumental work that offers easily the most comprehensive and thought-provoking treatment of English grammar to date. Nothing rivals this work, with respect to breadth, depth and consistency of coverage'. I fully agree with these sentiments. Huddleston, Pullum, and collaborators definitely deserve a prize for this achievement.

That same year, the book won the Leonard Bloomfield Book Award of the Linguistic Society of America.

== Views ==
Huddleston's grammatical frameworks, such as that in the Cambridge Grammar of the English Language, have been monotonic phrase-structure grammars, similar to X-bar theory but with explicit notation for syntactic functions such as subject, modifier, and complement. Monotonic phrase-structure grammars are based on the idea that the structure of sentences can be represented as a hierarchy of constituents, with each level of the hierarchy corresponding to a different level of grammatical organization. X-bar theory is a specific type of phrase-structure grammar that posits a uniform structure for all phrasal categories, with each phrase containing a "head" and optional specifier and/or complement.

The key difference between monotonic phrase-structure grammars and generative grammars like transformational-generative grammar (TGG) is the absence of transformations or movement operations in the former. Monotonic grammars maintain that the structure of a sentence remains fixed from its initial formation, whereas generative grammars propose that sentences can undergo various transformations during the derivation process.

He believes that some kind of fusion of functions accounts for noun phrases that lack noun heads.

=== Other ===
In 1999, a festschrift volume was produced "by colleagues past and present, friends and admirers of Rodney Huddleston, in order to honour his consistently outstanding contribution to grammatical theory and description": The Clause in English: In Honour of Rodney Huddleston.

Huddleston and his wife Vivienne now reside on Sunshine Coast, near Noosa Heads in Queensland, Australia.

== Partial bibliography ==
- Huddleston, Rodney D. (1971). The Sentence in Written English: A Syntactic Study Based on an Analysis of Scientific Texts, Cambridge University Press. ISBN 0-521-08062-2.
- Huddleston, Rodney D. (1976). An Introduction to English Transformational Syntax, Longman. ISBN 0-582-55062-9.
- Huddleston, Rodney D. (1984). Introduction to the Grammar of English, Cambridge University Press. ISBN 0-521-22893-X.
- Huddleston, Rodney D. (1988). English Grammar: An Outline, Cambridge University Press. ISBN 0-521-32311-8.
- Huddleston, Rodney D., and Geoffrey K. Pullum (2002). The Cambridge Grammar of the English Language, Cambridge University Press. ISBN 0-521-43146-8.
- Huddleston, Rodney D.; Pullum, Geoffrey K.; Reynolds, Brett (2022). A student's introduction to English grammar (2 ed.). Cambridge: Cambridge University Press. p. 157. ISBN 978-1-009-08574-8.
