= Bas Aarts =

Dutch-born British linguist

Sebastiaan Henri Lucas Marie (Bas) Aarts is a Dutch-born British linguist and academic. He is Professor of English Linguistics at University College London (UCL) and Director of the Survey of English Usage (SEU), a research unit specialising in English grammar, corpus linguistics, and language variation.

His research has focused on English syntax, grammatical theory, corpus linguistics, and the teaching of English grammar.

== Early life and education ==
Bas Aarts was born in 1961, to the linguist Flor Aarts and Sjé Aarts-Postmes. He was educated at Utrecht University (BA and MA), and at University College London, where he obtained an MA and a PhD in English Linguistics. (Note: Supervised by Sidney Greenbaum, the doctoral dissertation was Aarts, Sebastiaan Henri Lucas Marie (1990). Small Clauses in English: The prepositional, nominal and adjectival types (Thesis). London: University College London. ProQuest 10630750.)

== Academic career ==
Aarts became a lecturer at University College London (UCL) in 1989, and was appointed Professor of English Linguistics in 2003. Since 1997 he has served as Director of the Survey of English Usage (SEU), succeeding in the tradition established by Randolph Quirk, who founded the unit in 1959. Under his leadership, scholars at the SEU have continued work on English grammar, corpus-based linguistic research and language variation and change.

The SEU is the home of the British Component of the International Corpus of English (ICE-GB), used by scholars globally to study different varieties of English (World Englishes); and with Sean Wallis he compiled the Diachronic Corpus of Present-Day Spoken English (DCPSE), used to study changes in the English language over shorter periods, typically decades. These resources have been widely used in linguistic research and language teaching.

== Research ==
Aarts's research interests include English syntax and morphology, grammatical theory, syntactic gradience, corpus linguistics, English grammar pedagogy, and Modern English language structure.

His publications have addressed issues such as grammatical indeterminacy, verb phrase structure, English word classes, and language change.

== Books ==
- Small Clauses in English: the Nonverbal Types. Berlin: Mouton De Gruyter, 1992. ISBN 9783110861457. In Language, Theodore B. Fernald writes that a "major thesis" of the book is that "theoretical tools of analysis [specifically, Government and Binding] can be useful for the descriptive endeavor"; and that Aarts "seems to have amply demonstrated his point...." Despite certain caveats, Fernald concludes that "For the theorist who is not a specialist in the syntax of [small clauses], this work is likely to be a valuable introduction."
- The Verb in Contemporary English: Theory and Description. Edited with Charles F. Meyer. Cambridge: Cambridge University Press, 1995. ISBN 0-521-46039-5. Reviewing the book for Language, David Parkinson wrote that its coverage from a theoretical viewpoint in its first part and a descriptive one in its second pleasingly blurred the distinction between the two; in totality, the collection "shows how very diverse are the directions from which the English verb can be approached". Writing for Literary and Linguistic Computing, Lina Lena Opas praised the clarity of the editors' handling of the different approaches to verb complementation, whereby "the reader finds it easy to grasp why the issue is so complex". Reviewing the book for Natural Language Engineering, Mayumi Masuko found that the editors' introduction was "biased towards the so-called Government-and-Binding theory". More generally, she was disappointed by the book, regretting that the number of contributions restricted the length of each and prevented each from "leading to a convincing theoretical argument".
- Exploring Natural Language: the British Component of the International Corpus of English. With Gerald Nelson and Sean Wallis. Amsterdam: John Benjamins, 2002. ISBN 90-272-4888-5 (hard), ISBN 90-272-4889-3 (paper), ISBN 90-272-7535-1. Joybrato Mukherjee described this (in 2004) for English Language and Linguistics as "a comprehensive and detailed manual for the British component of the International Corpus of English, which in various regards represents the cutting edge of advancements in corpus compilation, software development, and corpus annotation".
- English Syntax and Argumentation. London: Macmillan, 1997. ISBN 0333643054, ISBN 0333643062. A review for Language described the book as "a solid exposition of the foundational topics required for the investigation and study of English sentence structure", saying that Aarts' analyses of the problems he poses in the last and most advanced part "make the point that not all of syntax is cut and dried; the field, even at this basic level, is still very much alive with controversy and interesting problems". (Also published in Korean translation.)
  - English Syntax and Argumentation. 2nd edition. Basingstoke: Palgrave, 2001. ISBN 0-333-71701-5 (hard), ISBN 0-333-69344-2 (paper). According to its preface, "This new edition is a completely revised and corrected version of the first edition."
  - English Syntax and Argumentation. 3rd edition. New York: Palgrave Macmillan, 2008. ISBN 9780230551213. This third edition "includes a new chapter on grammatical indeterminacy, terminological changes, new case studies, and the reorganization of some of the chapters"; a reviewer for the Linguistic Society of America concluded that it "is a pedagogic masterpiece for several reasons".
  - English Syntax and Argumentation. 4th edition. Basingstoke: Palgrave, 2013. ISBN 9780230361690. Adds a chapter on tense, aspect and mood.
  - English Syntax and Argumentation. 5th edition. London: Palgrave, 2018. ISBN 978-1-137-60579-5. Adds a chapter on information packaging.
  - English Syntax and Argumentation. 6th edition. London: Bloomsbury, 2024. ISBN 978-1-3503-5535-4 (hard), ISBN 978-1-3503-5536-1 (paper), ISBN 978-1-3503-5537-8 (PDF). Chapter sequence reorganized.
- Fuzzy Grammar: a Reader. Edited with David Denison, Evelien Keizer and Gergana Popova. Oxford: Oxford University Press, 2004. ISBN 978-0-19-926256-4, ISBN 978-0-19-926257-1. The editors' aim, "to bring together a number of classical and recent writings from philosophy and linguistics in the areas of vagueness and fuzziness", wrote Kleanthes K. Grohmann for Language, "has been achieved wonderfully". For those interested in issues such as the fuzziness of grammaticality or lexical classification, he concluded, "this is a fantastic collection".
- The Handbook of English Linguistics. Edited with April McMahon. Malden, Massachusetts: Blackwell, 2006. ISBN 978-1-4051-1382-3. The reviewer for the Journal of Linguistics regretted that this book, primarily intended for students, had such an emphasis on syntax, whereas it could instead have offered more that was topical and engaging. He found that among the book's 31 articles were plenty that were good or better, as well as some that disappointed. The reviewer for English Studies was far less critical, concluding that "Scholars of English Linguistics are very well-served by this volume."
  - The Handbook of English Linguistics. Edited with April McMahon and Lars Hinrichs. Hoboken, New Jersey: Wiley‐Blackwell, 2021. ISBN 9781119540564 (hard), ISBN 9781119540571 (PDF)
- Syntactic Gradience: the Nature of Grammatical Indeterminacy. Oxford: Oxford University Press, 2007. ISBN 978-0-19-921926-1, ISBN 978-0-19-921927-8 (paper). Reviewing the book for Journal of Linguistics, Ralf Vogel pointed out that the gradience discussed was not "gradient data from experimental or corpus studies" but primarily gradient categorization. Vogel particularly praised the survey in the book's first part of debates from the late 1950s to the present day over gradient categorization. However, he accused the book of "[c]onfounding innate and language-particular categories and criteria in [a] way does not make sense". He regretted the almost exclusive concentration on phenomena in English, suggesting that examination of their manifestation in other languages could have led the book to sounder conclusions. Reviewing this book for Functions of Language, Geoffrey Leech called it "the first concerted book-length attempt to make sense of the widely acknowledged and discussed phenomenon of grammatical indeterminacy". In the second of the book's three parts, Aarts posits subsective and intersective gradiences. The former is gradience within a category: one kind of which is prototypicality, whereby the prototypical adjective happy can be used in all the grammatical ways normally expected of an adjective ("She was happy", unhappy, etc), contrasting with the adjective utter, which can only be used attributively ("an utter disgrace"). Intersective gradience is the sharing by one word of characteristics of two lexical categories. In Aarts' example, working in "a working mother" has characteristics of both verb and adjective; but, thanks to a relative enumeration of these characteristics, it is (in Leech's words) "indubitably a verb (albeit a verb with adjectival leanings)". Leech concluded that despite "serious weaknesses and points of dispute in Aarts's model of gradience", this model was, unprecedentedly, "clear enough and plausible enough to form a platform for further debate and further progress. More than any preceding linguists, he has succeeded in being precise about grammatical indeterminacy."
- Oxford Modern English Grammar. Oxford: Oxford University Press, 2011. ISBN 978-0-19-953319-0. This replaced the 1996 OUP book The Oxford English Grammar, by Sidney Greenbaum, Aarts' predecessor as director of the Survey of English Usage). Unlike the earlier book, its scope was limited to syntax and morphology. A review by Brett Reynolds pointed out that it was a reference grammar and not a textbook, and "certainly not for typical English-language learners". However, it provided "analytical rigor and terminological consistency": for example, by limiting the meaning of determiner to the function, and for the word class instead using determinative. Reynolds observes that the book "is unlikely to find a large market among ELT teachers. This is a shame because ELT has too long ignored developments in linguistics, and explanations and presentations like those in [this book] are interesting and potentially pedagogically useful." A detailed review in Brno Studies in English called the book "modern, innovative, but at the same time concise", taking all its examples from the British component of the ICE corpus (sometimes with modifications), "largely [following]" the treatment of phrase structure in The Cambridge Grammar of the English Language (2002) but with terminological differences. It concluded by calling the book "a succinct guide to how English grammar works and how it can be described in an academic, yet reader-friendly manner". However, a reviewer for Reference Reviews disagreed with the claim in the cover blurb that the book was suitable for "anyone who needs a clear guide to English grammar", saying that it assumed some familiarity with current grammatical understanding.
- The Verb Phrase in English: Investigating Recent Language Change with Corpora. Edited with Joanne Close, Geoffrey Leech and Sean Wallis. Cambridge: Cambridge University Press, 2013. ISBN 978-1-107-01635-4. The book is part of a project on current changes in the verb phrase in British English funded by the Arts and Humanities Research Council. Such changes, it shows, can take place in periods as short as one or two decades. Chapters 2 to 6 are about new research methods, including the use of small corpora. Chapters 7 to 15 describe changes to the verb phrase. Reviewing the book for Lenguas Modernas, Maritza Ortega concluded that it "provides an excellent account on methodological issues" and "offers an outlook on current ongoing linguistic changes in the English verb phrase". Reviewing it for ICAME Journal, Peter Collins described all its chapters bar one (on Canadian English) as "concerned with British or American English, or both". "Verb phrase" is taken to have a rather wide application, but it is not defined. After examining a number of the individual chapters, Collins concluded that "This is a cutting edge volume, excellently presented with very few errata ..., which should be essential reading for scholars working on recent language change."
- The Oxford Dictionary of English Grammar. Second edition. With Sylvia Chalker and Edmund Weiner. Oxford: Oxford University Press, 2014. ISBN 978-0-19-965823-7. (Note: The first (1994) edition was edited by Chalker and Weiner. Aarts was brought in as first-named coeditor of the greatly revised second edition.) In a long review for English Language and Linguistics of this book (and Pam Peters' The Cambridge Dictionary of English Grammar), John Walmsley criticized the unsystematic glossing of grammatical abbreviations, and had other quibbles. But he wrote "The inclusion of encyclopedic information in these dictionaries ... effectively turns them into integrated structures of which the lexical section is only part. The reader is given not only the meaning of a term, but a reference to the system in which it is embedded." Thus both dictionaries list the different meanings of a word such as complement, linking each to a prominent exponent (e.g. The Cambridge Grammar of the English Language). Walmsley did not appreciate the lack of coverage of phonology (which the book's first edition had encompassed). A short review in Reference Reviews described the book as "[a]imed more at the academic market", but stated that "amateur-level grammarians and linguists will also find this dictionary instructive".
- How to Teach Grammar. With Ian Cushing and Richard Hudson. Oxford Teaching Guides. Oxford: Oxford University Press, 2019. ISBN 978-0-19-842151-1. The book is about the classroom teaching of English grammar (syntax and morphology, not phonology) to speakers of English in the UK. Despite mystification at the non-appearance of the "formerly fundamental" term gerund, John Hodgson, reviewing the book for English in Education, wrote that the book "[offers] an exhilarating account of significant grammatical features ... that will be of enormous help and support to English teachers". He regretted that it might not be suitable for primary education, as "Teachers of children in UK primary Key Stages 1 and 2 at the moment have to prepare their charges for the inanities of the Grammar, Punctuation and Spelling tests". (Note: Collectively, Grammar, Punctuation and Spelling are often, in the context of the UK primary school curriculum, called "SPaG" (for "Spelling, Punctuation and Grammar").)
- The Oxford Handbook of English Grammar. Edited with Jill Bowie and Gergana Popova. Oxford: Oxford University Press, 2019. ISBN 978-0-19-875510-4. In a long review for the Linguist List, Cameron Morin summarized each of the 33 chapters, noting that "Reading the book from beginning to end as I did is probably not the easiest and most productive approach to adopt in this case", but praised the book's "theoretical neutrality" and diversity, and concluded by saying that the book would be valuable for specialists wanting to keep up to date with work in areas other than their own. A review in Technical Communication praised the book on its own terms but warned that "technical communicators will likely find the book to be too esoteric for everyday use".

== Editorial work ==
Aarts is a founding editor (with David Denison and Richard Hogg) of the academic journal English Language and Linguistics, published by Cambridge University Press since 1997. The journal covers both synchronic and diachronic approaches to the study of English, and is a leading publication in the field.

== Other activities ==
With Sean Wallis, Aarts initiated the Englicious project at UCL, a knowledge transfer educational platform designed to support the teaching and learning of English grammar in schools. He also teaches on a number of online continuous professional development courses, e.g. English Grammar for Teachers and Teaching English Grammar in Context. (Note: A description: Aarts, Bas (15 May 2019). "Teaching English grammar: The Englicious approach". Languages, Society & Policy. Faculty of Modern & Medieval Languages and Linguistics, University of Cambridge.)

Aarts is a consultant for the Oxford English Dictionary, and from 2014 to 2018 served as an advisor at the UK Department for Education.

Aarts is married with children. He enjoys reading about history and looking at maps.

== Honours and recognition ==
He served as Vice-President (Profession) for the International Society for the Linguistics of English (2007–2012), as a member of the Council of the Philological Society (2015–2018), and as Vice-Dean for Innovation and Enterprise of the Faculty of Arts and Humanities, UCL (2016–2022).

He was elected a Member of the Academia Europaea in 2024.
