= Olga Fischer =

Dutch linguist

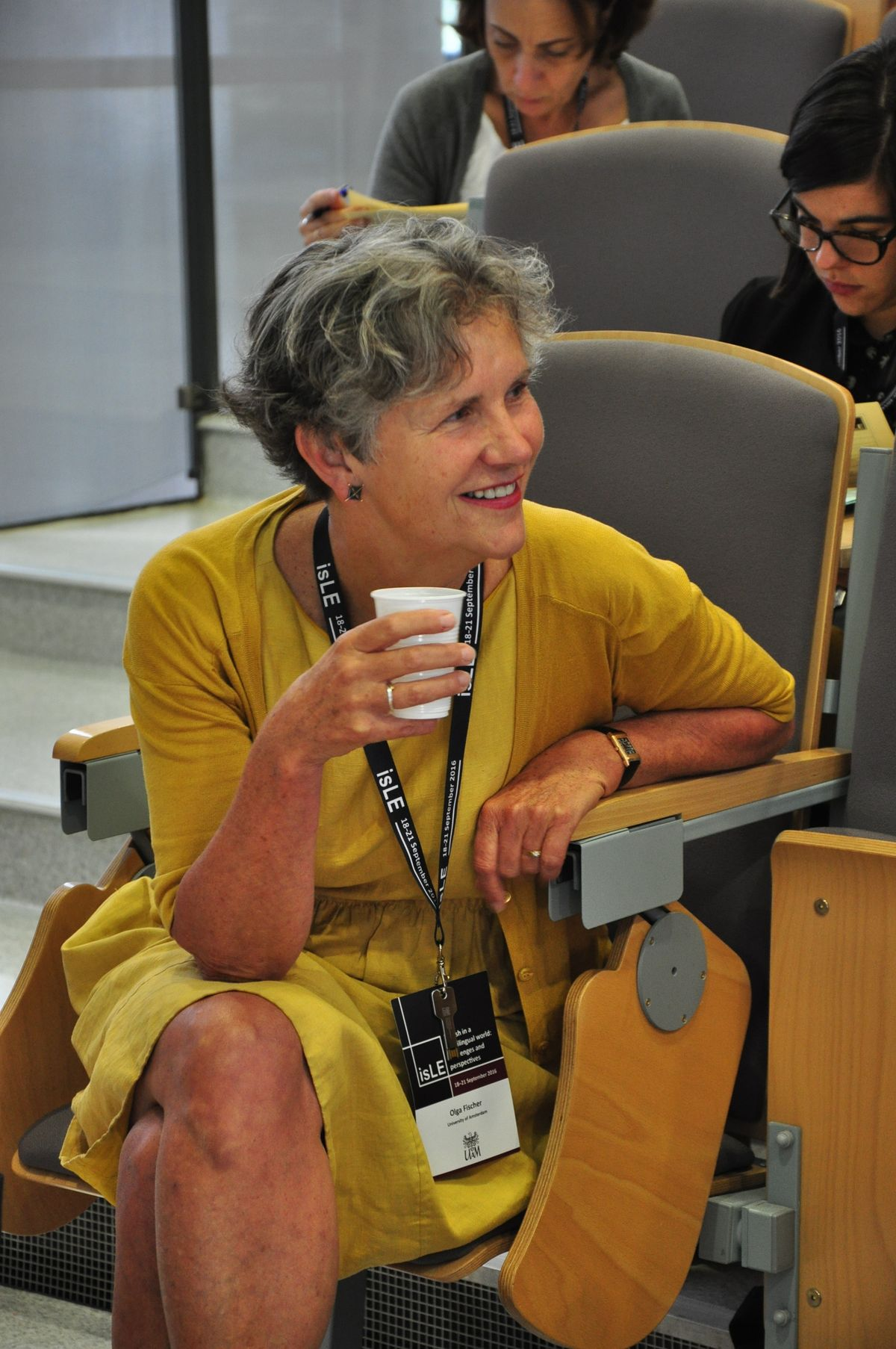
- Fischer at the 2016 ISLE conference in Poznań, Poland
- Born: 5 April 1951 (age 75); Hilversum, Netherlands
- Education: University of Amsterdam; Newcastle University
- Scientific career
- Fields: Linguistics (historical)
- Workplaces: University of Amsterdam

Olga Fischer (Dutch pronunciation: [ˈɔlɣaː ˈfɪɕər]; born 5 April 1951) is a Dutch linguist and an expert on the English language. She is Professor Emerita of Germanic Linguistics at the University of Amsterdam and former president of the International Society for the Linguistics of English.

Fischer has published extensively in the area of English historical linguistics, especially historical syntax, where her interests in syntactic change relate to changes in word order, comparison with developments in other West Germanic languages, grammaticalization, and the interaction between grammaticalization and iconicity in language change.

== Background and career ==
Fischer was born in Hilversum in 1951. She holds an M. A. in the History of English and General Linguistics from Newcastle University (1975) and an M. A. (doctoraalexamen) in English Language and Literature from the University of Amsterdam (1976, cum laude). She obtained her PhD from the University of Amsterdam (1990, cum laude) with a thesis entitled Syntactic Change and Causation: Developments in Infinitival Constructions in English.

Fischer was professor of Germanic Linguistics at the University of Amsterdam from 1999 until her retirement in 2016. During her academic career, she was a visiting scholar the University of Manchester and a visiting professor at the University of Zurich, the University of Innsbruck, the University of Vienna, and the University of Lille III. Fischer served as President of the Societas Linguistica Europaea in 2011. From 2014 to 2016 she was President of the International Society for the Linguistics of English.

== Research ==
Fischer's research has focused on the history of English, in particular on morphosyntactic changes in the Old English and Middle English periods. In this field, she has worked on the development of infinitives, on word order changes within the noun phrase, and on the role played by analogy in language change.

Some of her other interests are grammaticalization and iconicity in language, and the interrelation between these two phenomena. She has also been concerned with the ontological status of grammaticalization, and whether it should be regarded as an epiphenomenon or a separate mechanism in language change. This question is dealt with extensively in her book Morphosyntactic Change (Oxford University Press, 2007), which compares formal and functional approaches to historical linguistics and language change.

Fischer has co-organized several international symposia on iconicity and is one of the editors of the book series Iconicity in Language and Literature, published by John Benjamins. Since 1998 she has been the editor of the language section of The Year's Work in English Studies, published by the English Association.

== Selected publications ==
=== As (co-)author ===
- Morphosyntactic Change: Functional and Formal Perspectives. Oxford: Oxford University Press, 2007. ISBN 9780199267057
- (with Wim van der Wurff), "Syntax", in Richard M. Hogg and David Denison (eds.): A History of the English Language. Cambridge: Cambridge University Press, 2006. ISBN 9780521717991
- (with Ans van Kemenade, Willem Koopman and Wim van der Wurff), The Syntax of Early English. Cambridge: Cambridge University Press, 2000. ISBN 9780521556262
- "Syntax", in Norman Blake (ed.): The Cambridge History of the English Language, Vol. II: 1066-1474. Cambridge: Cambridge University Press, 1992. ISBN 9780521264754
- Syntactic Change and Causation: Developments in Infinitival Constructions in English. University of Amsterdam dissertation, 1990.

=== As co-editor ===
- (with Muriel Norde and Harry Perridon), Up and Down the Cline – The Nature of Grammaticalization. Amsterdam: John Benjamins, 2004. ISBN 9781588115041
- (with Max Nänny), The Motivated Sign. Amsterdam: John Benjamins, 2001. ISBN 9781588110039
- (with Anette Rosenbach and Dieter Stein), Pathways of Change: Grammaticalization in English. Amsterdam: John Benjamins, 2000. ISBN 9781556199394
- (with Max Nänny), Form Miming Meaning: Iconicity in Language and Literature. Amsterdam: John Benjamins, 1999. ISBN 9781556195334
