= English articles =

English words "the", "a(n)", and sometimes "some"

The articles in English are the definite article the and the indefinite article a (which takes the alternate form an when followed by a vowel sound). They are the two most common determiners. The definite article is the default determiner when the speaker believes that the listener knows the identity of a common noun's referent (because it is obvious, because it is common knowledge, or because it was mentioned in the same sentence or an earlier sentence). The indefinite article is the default determiner for other singular, countable, common nouns, while no determiner is the default for other common nouns. Other determiners are used to add semantic information such as amount (many, a few), proximity (this, those), or possession (my, the government's).

== Usage ==
English grammar requires that, in most cases, a singular, countable noun phrase start with a determiner. For example, I have a box is grammatically correct, but *I have box (Note: This article uses asterisks to indicate ungrammatical examples.) is not. The most common determiners are the articles the and a(n), which specify the presence or absence of definiteness of the noun. Other possible determiners include words like this, my, each and many. There are also cases where no determiner is required, as in the sentence John likes fast cars, where neither John nor fast cars includes a determiner.

The definite article the is the default when the referent of the noun phrase headed by a common noun is assumed to be unique or known from the context. For example, In the sentence The boy with glasses was looking at the moon, it is assumed that in the context the reference can only be to one boy and one moon. However, the definite article is not typically used:

- with generic nouns (plural or uncountable): cars have accelerators, happiness is contagious, referring to cars in general and happiness in general (compare the happiness I felt yesterday, specifying particular happiness);
- with proper names: John, France, London, etc.

The indefinite article a (before a consonant sound) or an (before a vowel sound) is used only with singular, countable nouns. It indicates that the referent of the noun phrase is one unspecified member of a class. For example, the sentence An ugly man was smoking a pipe does not specify the identity of the ugly man or pipe.

When referring to a particular date, the definite article the is typically used.

- He was born on the 10th of May.

When referring to a day of the week, the indefinite article "a" or definite article "the" may be used, following the same guidelines of generality versus specificity.

- He was born on a Thursday.
- He was born on the Monday before Thanksgiving.

No article is used with plural or uncountable nouns when the referent is indefinite (just as in the generic definite case described above). However, in such situations, the determiner some is often added (or any in negative contexts and in many questions). For example:

- There are apples in the kitchen or There are some apples in the kitchen;
- We do not have information or We do not have any information;
- Would you like tea? or Would you like some tea? and Would you like any tea? or Would you like some good tea?

Additionally, articles are not normally used:

- in noun phrases that contain other determiners (my house, this cat, America's history), although one can combine articles with certain other determiners, as in the many issues, such a child (see English determiners § Combinations of determiners).
- with pronouns (he, nobody), although again certain combinations are possible (as the one, the many, the few).
- preceding noun phrases consisting of a clause or infinitive phrase (what you've done is very good, to surrender is to die).

If it is required to be concise, e.g. in headlines, signs, labels, and notes, articles are often omitted along with certain other function words. For example, rather than The mayor was attacked, a newspaper headline might say just Mayor attacked.

For more information on article usage, see the sections definite article and indefinite article below. For more cases where no article is used, see Zero article in English.

== Word order ==
In most cases, the article is the first word of its noun phrase, preceding all other adjectives and modifiers.

- [The little old red bag] held [a very big surprise].

There are a few things that are the same, and:

- Certain determiners, such as all, both, half, double, precede the definite article when used in combination (all the team, both the girls, half the time, double the amount).
- Exclamative markers of nominals, though still also determinative, precede the indefinite article: such (He is such an idiot!) and what (What a day!).
- Adjectives qualified by too, so, as and how generally precede the indefinite article: too great a loss, so hard a problem, as delicious an apple as I have ever tasted, I know how pretty a girl she is.
- When adjectives are qualified by quite (particularly when it means "fairly"), the word quite (but not the adjective itself) often precedes the indefinite article: quite a long letter.

See also English determiners § Combinations of determiners and Determiners and adjectives.

== Definite article: the, þe, ye ==
The only definite article in English is the word the, denoting person(s) or thing(s) already mentioned, under discussion, implied, or otherwise presumed familiar to the listener or reader. The is the most commonly used word in the English language, accounting for 7% of all words used.

The can be used with both singular and plural nouns, with nouns of any gender, and with nouns that start with any letter. This is different from many other languages which have different articles for different genders and/or numbers.

=== Ye form ===
In Middle English, the digraph ⟨th⟩ was written using the letter thorn, þ and thus the modern form the was written as þe. For reasons explained at The § Ye form, ⟨þ⟩ came to be replaced in printing by the letter ⟨y⟩. Thus þe became ye and that in turn led to titles like Ye Olde Curiosity Shoppe.

=== Abbreviations for the and that ===
"... by the grace that god put ..." (extract from the The Book of Margery Kempe c.1450s)

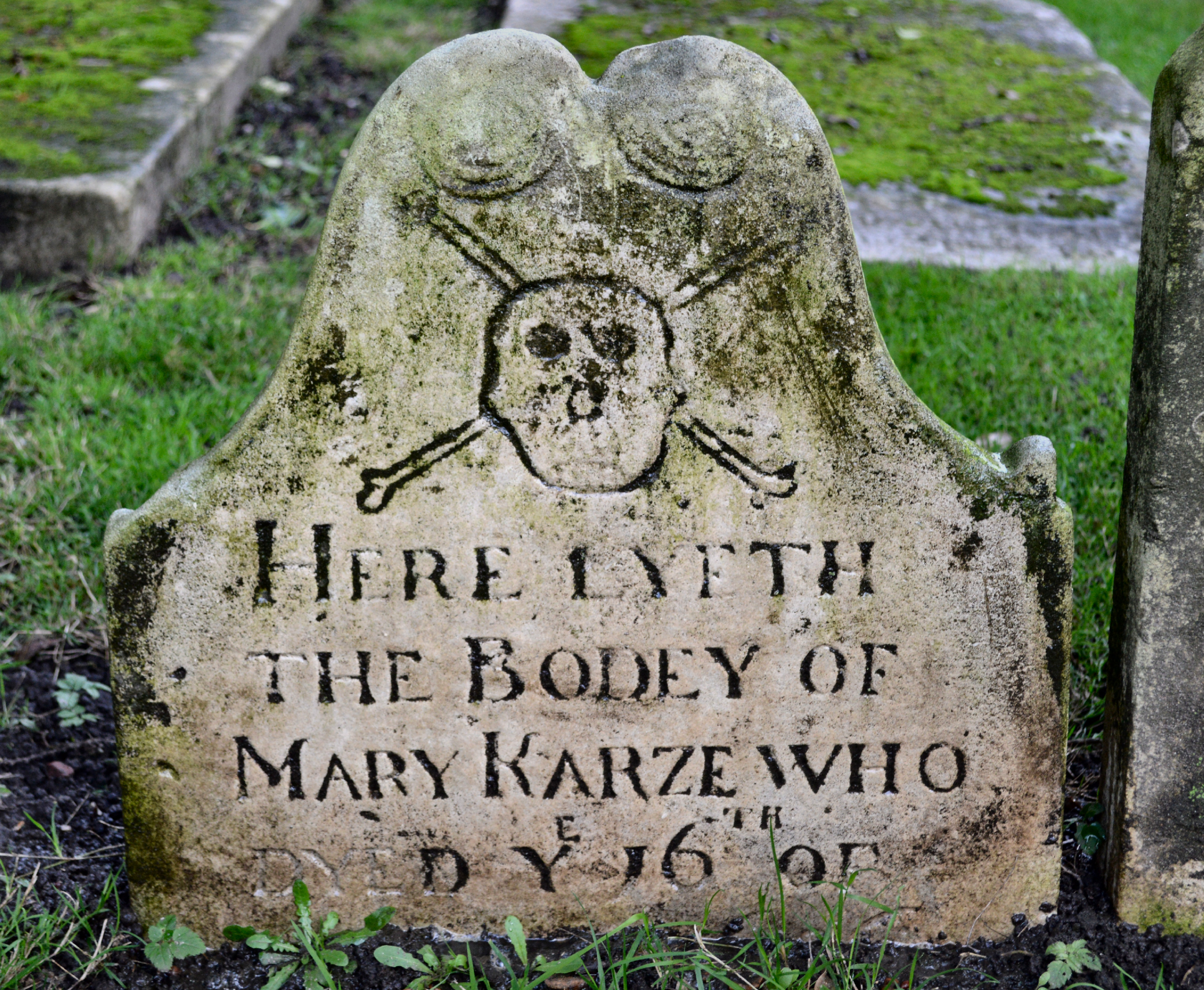
Gravestone of 1686 with the long and short forms of "the" used.

Ledgerstone of 1766; a rare, late, instance of yͤ

Since the remains a "top 3" word, at first commonly but decreasingly, initially driven by the cost of stonemasonry and parchment, even shorter forms of it exist, especially as þ wore out in late Middle English through to Early Modern English. In Middle English, þe (the) was frequently abbreviated as þͤ, a ⟨þ⟩ with a small ⟨e⟩ above it. Similarly abbreviated that was þͭ, a ⟨þ⟩ with a small ⟨t⟩ above it. As a result, the use of a ⟨y⟩ with an ⟨e⟩ above it as an abbreviation became common. yͤ endures into reprints of the 1611 edition of the King James Version of the Bible in rare places such as Romans 15:29 or in the Mayflower Compact and many gravestones in regions keeping hold of pre-cast sets (not imitation/replica artisanship) until about the 1780s. The forms yͤ and yͭ were developed from ⟨þͤ⟩ and ⟨þͭ⟩ and appear in Early Modern manuscripts and in print.

== Indefinite article: a, an ==
The indefinite article of English takes the two forms: a and an. Semantically, they mean a quantity of one, usually without emphasis. They can be used only with singular countable nouns; for the mainstream use of some (or any) as an equivalent with plural and uncountable nouns, see Use of some below.

=== Etymology ===
An is the older form (related to one, which it also predates, cognate to Dutch een, German ein, Gothic 𐌰𐌹𐌽𐍃 (ains), Old Norse einn, etc.). The Old English word ān was derived from Proto-West Germanic *ain, which was derived from Proto-Germanic *ainaz. All of these words descended from Proto-Indo-European *óynos, meaning "single".

=== Distinction between a and an ===
The [n] of the Old English indefinite article ān got gradually assimilated before consonant sounds in almost all dialects by the 15th century. Before vowel sounds, the [n] survives in Modern English.

Currently, an is used before words starting with a vowel sound, regardless of whether the word begins with a vowel letter. Where the next word begins with a consonant sound, a is used. Examples: a box; an apple; an SSO (pronounced "es-es-oh"); an MP3 (pronounced "em-pee-three"); a HEPA filter (here, HEPA is an acronym, a series of letters pronounced as a word rather than as individual letters); an hour (the h is silent); a one-armed bandit (pronounced "won..."); an $80 fee (read "an eighty-dollar fee"); an herb in American English (where the h is silent), but a herb in British English; a unionized worker but an un-ionized particle. Before words beginning with /ju/, an was formerly widespread, e.g. an unicorn, an eulogy, but has largely been superseded by a since the 19th century.

In oldest loan words of Latin or Greek provenance, initial h tended to be silent, thus the use of a preceding an was common and has survived to some extent to recent times even when the h has been restored as non-silent. Some speakers and writers use an before a word beginning with the sound /h/ in an unstressed syllable: an historical novel, an hotel. However, this usage is now less common.

Some dialects, particularly in England (such as Cockney), silence many or all initial h sounds (h-dropping) –s meaning for example standard English a helmet is instead an 'elmet.

There used to be a distinction analogous to this for the possessive determiners my and (archaic) thy, which often reverted to mine and thine before a vowel, as in mine eyes.

==== In other languages ====
Other more or less analogous cases in different languages include the Yiddish articles "a" (אַ) and "an" (אַן) (used in essentially the same manner as the English ones), the Hungarian articles a and az (used the same way, except that they are definite articles; juncture loss, as described below, has occurred in that language too), and the privative a- and an- prefixes, meaning "not" or "without", in Greek and Sanskrit.

=== Pronunciation ===
Both a and an are usually pronounced with a schwa: /ə/, /ən/. However, when stressed (which is rare in ordinary speech), they are normally pronounced respectively as /eɪ/ (to rhyme with day) and /æn/ (to rhyme with pan). See Weak and strong forms in English.

=== Juncture loss ===
In a process called juncture loss, the n has wandered back and forth between the indefinite article and words beginning with vowels over the history of the language, where for example what was once a nuncle is now an uncle. One example is the text "smot hym on the hede with a nege tool" from 1448 in the Paston Letters, meaning "smote him on the head with an edge tool". Other examples include a nox for an ox and a napple for an apple. Sometimes the change has been permanent. For example, a newt was once an ewt, a nickname was once an ekename, where eke means "extra" (as in eke out meaning "add to"), and in the other direction, a napron (meaning a little tablecloth, related to the word napkin) became an apron, and a nadder became an adder. The initial n in orange was also dropped through juncture loss, but this happened before the word was borrowed into English.

== Use of some ==
The existential determinative (or determiner) some is sometimes used as a functional equivalent of a(n) with plural and uncountable nouns (also called a partitive). For example, Give me some apples, Give me some water (equivalent to the singular countable forms an apple and a glass of water). Grammatically this some is not required; it is also possible to use zero article: Give me apples, Give me water. The use of some in such cases implies some limited quantity. (Compare the forms unos/unas in Spanish, which are the plural of the indefinite article un/una.) Like the articles, some belongs to the class of "central determiners", which are mutually exclusive (so "the some boys" is ungrammatical).

The contrasting use of any in negative clauses proves that some is polarity-sensitive, and occurs in positive clauses: "I have some objections to make", vs. "I don't have any objections to make"; "I have any objections to make" and "I don't have some objections to make" are ungrammatical.

Some can also have a more emphatic meaning: "some but not others" or "some but not many". For example, some people like football, while others prefer rugby, or I've got some money, but not enough to lend you any. It can also be used as an indefinite pronoun, not qualifying a noun at all (Give me some!) or followed by a prepositional phrase (I want some of your vodka); the same applies to any.

Some can also be used with singular countable nouns, as in There is some person on the porch, which implies that the identity of the person is unknown to the speaker (which is not necessarily the case when a(n) is used). This usage is fairly informal, although singular countable some can also be found in formal contexts: We seek some value of x such that...

When some is used just as an indefinite article, it is normally pronounced weakly, as [s(ə)m]. In other meanings, it is pronounced [sʌm].

== Effect on alphabetical order ==
In sorting titles and phrases alphabetically, articles are usually excluded from consideration, since being so common makes them more of a hindrance than a help in finding the desired item. For example, The Comedy of Errors is alphabetized before A Midsummer Night's Dream, because the and a are ignored and comedy alphabetizes before midsummer. In an index, the former work might be written "Comedy of Errors, The", with the article moved to the end.

== In West Country English ==
Speakers of West Country English may use articles in certain environments where speakers of Standard English would not. Non-standard uses occur for example with diseases (the chicken pox, the arthritis), quantifying expressions (the both, the most), holidays (the Christmas), geographical units and institutions (the church, the county Devon), etc. The indefinite article a, not "an" is still used by some speakers before vowels.

== See also ==
- False title – Grammatical construct in English, a noun phrase that does not start with an article (as conventionally it should)
