= CGEL =

- A Comprehensive Grammar of the English Language by Randolph Quirk, Sidney Greenbaum, Geoffrey Leech, and Jan Svartvik, published in 1985
- The Cambridge Grammar of the English Language by Rodney Huddleston and Geoffrey K. Pullum, published in 2002
