= Jeremy J. Smith =

British philologist

Jeremy J. Smith is a British philologist who is Professor of English Philology at the University of Glasgow.

== Biography ==
Jeremy J. Smith has served as Professor of English Philology at the University of Glasgow since 2000. He is also a visiting professor at the University of Stavanger. Smith specialises in English historical linguistics, in the history of Scots, and in the textual cultures of Britain and Ireland. He has published a number of books and articles, and teaches a range of courses, in these areas, in which he is internationally renowned.

Smith is a founding member of the Medieval Manuscripts Research Consortium, a member of the Board of Trustees of Scottish Language Dictionaries Ltd and the Council of the Scottish Text Society, a Fellow of the English Association, a Fellow of the Royal Society of Edinburgh, and an Honorary Fellow of the Association for Scottish Literary Studies. He is currently President of the International Society for the Linguistics of English.

== Selected bibliography ==
- Scots and English in the letters of John Knox, 2010
- Older Scots: A Linguistic Reader, 2012
- Smith, Jeremy J. (1 July 2024). "On "Standard" Written English in the Later Middle Ages". Speculum. 99 (3): 762–779. doi:10.1086/730766. ISSN 0038-7134.

== Notes and references ==
=== References ===
- Nevalainen, Terttu; Traugott, Elizabeth Closs, eds. (1952). The Oxford Handbook of the History of English. Oxford University Press. p. xxxiii. ISBN 0190627883.
