= English nouns =

Part of speech

English nouns form the largest category of words in English, both in the number of different words and how often they are used in typical texts. The three main categories of English nouns are common nouns, proper nouns, and pronouns. A defining feature of English nouns is their ability to inflect for number, as through the plural –s morpheme. English nouns primarily function as the heads of noun phrases, which prototypically function at the clause level as subjects, objects, and predicative complements. These phrases are the only English phrases whose structure includes determinatives and predeterminatives, which add abstract-specifying meaning such as definiteness and proximity. Like nouns in general, English nouns typically denote physical objects, but they also denote actions (e.g., get up and have a stretch), characteristics (e.g., this red is lovely), relations in space (e.g., closeness), and just about anything at all. Taken together, these features separate English nouns from other lexical categories such as adjectives and verbs.

In this article English nouns include English pronouns but not English determiners. (Note: Some theories suggest that determiners are actually types of pronouns or the other way around. See English determiners for more on this point. Also, for simplicity, this article will set aside the DP hypothesis.)

== Subtypes ==
English nouns are classified into three major subtypes: common nouns, proper nouns, and pronouns, each with its own typical syntactic behaviour.

=== Proper nouns ===
Proper nouns are a class of words such as December, Canada, Leah, and Johnson that occur within noun phrases (NPs) that are proper names, though not all proper names contain proper nouns (e.g., General Electric is a proper name with no proper noun). "The central cases of proper names", according to The Cambridge Grammar of the English Language, "are expressions which have been conventionally adopted as the name of a particular entity." A prominent category of proper names is of those assigned to particular people or animals (Elizabeth, Fido). Others include particular places (New Zealand, the United States of America) and institutions (Cambridge University, the United States Senate). While proper names may be realized by multi-word constituents, a proper noun is a word-level unit in English. Thus, Zealand, for example, is a proper noun, but New Zealand, though a proper name, is not a proper noun.

Unlike some common nouns, proper nouns do not typically show number contrast in English. Most proper nouns in English are singular and lack a plural form, though some may instead be plural and lack a singular form. For example, we typically expect Michigan but not *Michigans, and the Philippines but not *Philippine. (Note: This article uses asterisks to indicate ungrammatical examples.) Proper nouns also differ from common nouns in that they typically lack either a determinative or determinative contrast. For instance, we typically expect Michigan but not *a Michigan, and though the Bahamas includes the determinative the, the determinative cannot normally be varied (compare *a Bahama and *some Bahamas). Finally, proper nouns differ from common nouns in that they typically cannot be modified by restrictive modifiers.

In English, the features that distinguish proper nouns from common nouns do not necessarily apply in the rare situations in which proper nouns lack unique denotation. For example, London typically refers to a unique place, but someone trying to disambiguate between two places named London might pluralize it (Which of the Londons are you referring to?), add a determinative (Do you mean the London in Ontario?), or add a restrictive modifier (Do you mean the London in Ontario?).

=== Pronouns ===
English pronouns are a closed category of words that have a variety of features distinguishing them from common and proper nouns. Unlike common nouns, pronouns are mostly deictic and anaphoric pro-forms. In the clause I like you, for instance, I and you are deictic in that their meanings can only be understood in relation to the context of the utterance. In the clause Tell Anne I want to talk to her, on the other hand, her is anaphoric in that the pronoun derives its meaning from its antecedent (Anne).

Also unlike common nouns, English pronouns show distinctions in case (e.g., I, me, mine), person (e.g., I, you) and gender (e.g., he, she). Though both common nouns and pronouns show number distinction in English, they do so differently: common nouns tend to take an inflectional ending (–s) to mark plurals, but pronouns typically do not. (The pronoun one is an exception, as in I like those ones.) English pronouns are also more limited than common nouns in their ability to take dependents. For instance, while common nouns can often be preceded by a determinative (e.g., the car), pronouns cannot.

In English conversation, pronouns are roughly as frequent as other nouns. In fiction, pronouns are about one third of all nouns, and in news and academic English, less than ten percent of nouns.

=== Common nouns ===
Common nouns are defined as those that are neither proper nouns nor pronouns. They are the most numerous and the most frequently used in English.

Common nouns can be further divided into count and non-count nouns. A count noun can take a number as its determiner (e.g., -20 degrees, zero calories, one cat, two bananas, 276 dollars). These nouns tend to designate individually identifiable entities, whereas a non-count noun designates a continuum or an undifferentiated mass (air, cheese, lots of gravel some water, enough heat). The count and non-count distinction also affects what other determiners can occur with the nouns: singular count nouns can occur with a but not some (e.g., a chair but not usually *some chair) (Note: More strictly, as a countable singular noun, it cannot be used with the some (normally pronounced /səm/) of "I need some money" (a positive-oriented existential quantifier, contrasting with negative-oriented any of "I don't need any money"). However, it can be used with the "vague count singular use" of some (/sʌm/, homophonous with sum): "It seemed that some chair was blocking the door" is fully idiomatic, and "conveys that the identity is of little importance".) while non-count nouns can occur with some but not a (e.g., some furniture but not *a furniture). Many common nouns have both count and non-count senses. For example, beer has a non-count sense in she was drinking beer but a count sense in she drank another beer.

== Morphology ==
=== Inflection ===
A defining property of English nouns is their ability to inflect for number (i.e., singular or plural (Note: Along with singular and plural, Old English also had dual pronouns.)). In addition to number, English pronouns can inflect for case, a feature shared by some NPs (see the discussion of case below) but not common nouns themselves.

==== Common nouns ====
Common nouns in English have little inflectional morphology, inflecting only for number. In modern English writing, the plural is usually formed with the –s morpheme, which can be realized phonetically as /s/, /z/, or /əz/. For example, the singular nouns cat, dog, and bush are pluralized as cats (s = /s/), dogs (s = /z/), and bushes (es = /əz/), respectively. Irregularly, English nouns are marked as plural in other ways, often inheriting the plural morphology of older forms of English or the languages that they are borrowed from. Plural forms from Old English resulted from vowel mutation (e.g., foot/feet), adding –en (e.g., ox/oxen), or making no change at all (e.g., this sheep/those sheep). English has also borrowed the plural forms of loanwords from various languages, such as Latin (e.g., stimulus/stimuli) and Greek (e.g., criterion/criteria).

Some varieties of English use different methods of marking the plural, many of which fall into one of three patterns. First, the plural morpheme may be absent when another word already indicates that the noun is plural. In the clause two girl just left, for instance, speakers of some varieties would not use the plural morpheme on the noun girl because the determiner two already marks the noun phrase as plural. Dem, which is derived from them, is often used without the plural morpheme, as in dem book (rather than dem books). This method of plural marking occurs in Gullah and Caribbean English among other varieties. Second, the plural morpheme may be absent specifically in noun phrases denoting weights and measures but not in other situations. Thus, some varieties may produce noun phrases like ten mile (rather than ten miles) while still using the plural morpheme in other contexts (e.g., two girls). This method of plural marking for weights and measures occurs in certain rural varieties of Southern U.S. English. Third, irregular plural nouns may be regularized and use the –s morpheme. This may happen when the plural is not otherwise marked (e.g., sheeps for sheep), when the plural is typically marked with a morpheme other than –s (e.g., oxes for oxen), or when the plural is typically formed through vowel mutation (e.g., foots for feet). For plurals marked by vowel mutation, some varieties may double mark the plural (e.g., feets). Regularization of plural marking occurs in several Englishes, including African-American English.

Traditional grammars suggest that English nouns can also take genitive case endings, as in the –'s in the cat's paws. Grammars informed by modern linguistics, however, analyze this ending as applying to entire noun phrases rather than the nouns themselves. In the phrase the cat with brown fur's paws, for example, the possessor is realized by the entire noun phrase the cat with brown fur, not just the noun fur. This analysis can be illustrated in bracketed notation:

- [_{NP} [_{NP} the cat]'s paws]
- [_{NP} [_{NP} the cat with brown fur]'s paws]

==== Pronouns ====
Those types that are indisputably pronouns are the personal pronouns, relative pronouns, interrogative pronouns, and reciprocal pronouns. The following table presents the Modern Standard English pronouns (for pronouns in other dialects, see the main article on English pronouns). Nominative case is usually used for subjects (e.g., I went) and accusative for objects (e.g., Help me). Reflexives are typically objects when the subject and object are the same person or people. Genitives are used for possession, belonging, sources, ancestry, etc. The independent genitive typically forms a noun phrase all on its own (e.g., Mine works), while the dependent genitive usually occurs together with a head noun on which it depends (e.g., [My copy] works.).

| | | | Nominative | Accusative | Reflexive | Independent genitive | Dependent genitive |
|---|---|---|---|---|---|---|---|
| First person | Singular | | I | me | myself | mine | my |
| First person | Plural | | we | us | ourselves | ours | our |
| Second person | Singular | | you | you | yourself | yours | your |
| Second person | Plural | | you | you | yourselves | yours | your |
| Third person | Singular | Masculine | he | him | himself | his | his |
| Third person | Singular | Feminine | she | her | herself | hers | her |
| Third person | Singular | Neuter | it | it | itself | its^{†} | its |
| Third person | Singular | Epicene | they | them | themselves/ themself | theirs | their |
| Third person | Plural | | they | them | themselves | theirs | their |
| Indefinite (Generic) | | | one | one | oneself | | one's |
| Wh-form | Relative & interrogative | Personal | who | whom | | whose^{††} | whose |
| Wh-form | Relative & interrogative | Non-personal | what | what | | | |
| Wh-form | Relative & interrogative | Non-personal | which | which | | | |
| Reciprocal | | | | each other/ one another | | each other's/ one another's | each other's/ one another's |
| Dummy | | | there it | | | | |

^{†} Rare.
^{††} Interrogative only (e.g., Whose is this?). Relative whose is not possible (e.g.,*This is Kim's, whose we forgot). (Note: The asterisk marks the sentence as ungrammatical)

=== Derivational (for common nouns) ===
The most common noun-forming suffixes in English are -tion, -ism, -ity, and -ness. For example, the verb activate + -tion becomes the noun activation. English nouns can also be formed by conversion (no change, e.g., run [verb] → run [noun]) and compounding (putting two bases together, e.g., grand + mother → grandmother).

There are also many prefixes that can be attached to English nouns to change their meaning. A small list of examples include anti-, bi-, dis-, hyper-, mega-, non-, & re- (e.g., re- + vision → revision).

== Semantics of nouns and noun phrases ==
English noun phrases typically inherit the denotation of the head noun. On top of this, they may have many other semantic characteristics including definiteness, reference, specificity, number, quantification, gender, and person.

=== Denotation and reference ===
English nouns prototypically denote entities. The denotation of an expression is its literal meaning, such as those meanings listed within monolingual dictionaries. For example, one of the things that apple denotes is "the fleshy, usually rounded red, yellow, or green edible pome fruit of a usually cultivated tree (genus Malus) of the rose family".

English noun phrases can also refer to entities. A noun phrase is referential if it is used to pick out an entity that is distinguished by properties other those inherent in the meaning of the noun phrase itself. For instance, the noun phrase his dog in Sam found his dog picks out a particular entity (a dog) that is distinguishable by properties not expressed in the meaning of dog (such as breed, color, and the like).

Not all noun phrases refer. In fact, some kinds of noun phrases are inherently non-referential. These include negative, interrogative, and bare role noun phrases as well as noun phrases with either or each functioning as a determinative. The underlined NPs in the following examples do not refer:

1. Negative: Nobody came.
2. Interrogative: Who likes ice cream?
3. Bare role: She was elected president.
4. Either as determinative: Either team might win the game.
5. Each as determinative: She interviewed each child in turn.
6. Dummy pronoun: It's raining.
7. Existential there: There's a problem.

=== Countability and number ===
Common nouns may be divided into count nouns and non-count nouns. English nouns typically have both count and non-count senses, though for a given noun one sense typically dominates. For example, apple is usually countable (two apples), but it also has a non-count sense (e.g., this pie is full of apple). When discussing different types of something, a count form is available for almost any noun (e.g., This shop carries many cheeses. = "many types of cheese").

Non-count nouns denote things that, when put together, remain the same thing. For example, if I have luggage and you give me more luggage, I still just have luggage. Count nouns fail this test: if you have an apple, and I give you more apple or more apples, you no longer just have an apple.

Modern English marks a division between singular and plural number. (Old English pronouns also marked the dual number.) Singular number restricts the denotation of the noun to the set of singularities. Plural number is often said to mean more than one, but, in fact, it restricts the denotation of the noun to the set of non-singularities. That is, in English, plural nouns are appropriate for quantities denoted by all the real numbers, including 0 and other quantities smaller than 1, except exactly ±1.

Some nouns are plural only (also known as plural tantum), many of which are non-count. These include those formed from -ing verbs such as makings meaning roughly `potential'; nouns having to do with compensation, such as dues, earnings, and wages; expressions of feelings, such as condolences, regards, and thanks; and various others, including alms, credentials, genitals, heads (on a coin), looks, reams, etc. Some, such as cattle and police, do not have any plural morphology.

The semantic number and grammatical number of a particular NP may not match. For example, with collective nouns such as committee, which denote a unit composed of multiple individuals, agreement can either be singular because the noun is morphologically singular (e.g., The committee has not yet come to a decision) or plural because it is semantically plural (e.g.,The committee have not yet come to a decision). Conversely, the morphological plural does not always call for plural agreement, as in sports is a microcosm of society.

=== Gender and animacy ===
Modern English has lost the system of grammatical gender that was present in Old English, and while there is some disagreement over what has replaced it, generally speaking English is said to have a system of "natural gender", which applies only to the pronouns. A natural gender is one "in which there is a clear correlation between masculine and feminine nouns and biological traits in the referent." But whether this accurately characterizes the English gender system is disputed.

The Cambridge Grammar of the English Language argues that English has a "weakly grammaticalized" gender, which is based only on pronoun agreement. This gender system involves two subsystems: one involving the distinctions between the personal pronouns he, she, and it and another involving the distinctions between the relative pronouns who and which. In the personal pronoun subsystem, nouns can be classified according to whether they are compatible with one, two, or three of these three personal pronouns. Single-gender and dual-gender nouns can be subclassified according to which specific pronouns they agree with. This results in seven classes:

- Single-gender masculine nouns (e.g., boy, stepson)
- Single-gender feminine nouns (e.g., girl, stepdaughter, actress)
- Single-gender neuter nouns (e.g., arrival, beer)
- Dual-gender masculine/feminine nouns (e.g., actor, doctor)
- Dual-gender masculine/neuter nouns (e.g., bull, brother)
- Dual-gender feminine/neuter nouns (e.g., cow, sister, ship)
- Triple-gender nouns (e.g., baby, dog)

These classes are not equally common. For instance, single-gender neuter nouns account for a large majority of common nouns while dual-gender masculine/neuter nouns account for only male animal species and certain kinship terms that can apply to both humans and animals.

In the relative pronoun subsystem, nouns can be classified according to whether they agree with who or which. Nouns that agree with who are called personal (or animate) nouns while nouns that agree with which are called non-personal (or inanimate) nouns. Though there is substantial overlap between non-personal nouns and neuter nouns and between personal nouns and masculine and feminine nouns, the overlaps are not perfect. For instance, a ship can agree with either it or she but can only agree with which (not who). Similarly, which can serve as an antecedent to he or she, as in there is a dog which attacked his/her owner.

== The syntax of nouns and noun phrases ==
Some defining properties of English nouns are that they function as the heads of NPs and that they can be specified by determinatives and modified by pre-head adjective phrases. A defining property of English NPs is that they prototypically function at the clause level as subjects, objects, and predicative complements.

=== Functions ===
English nouns function as the head of a nominal (see Internal structure below), which in turn mostly functions as the head of an NP. At the clause-level, English NPs typically function as subjects, objects, and predicative complements. The following table shows these typical functions and the other functions NPs can take:

Functions of noun phrases
| Function | | | Noun type | |
| Function | | | Common & proper | Pronoun |
|---|---|---|---|---|
| Complement | Subject | | Jess is here. | She is here. |
| Complement | Object | Direct | I have two pens. | I have them. |
| Complement | Object | Indirect | He tells Jess a story. | He tells him a story. |
| Complement | Predicative | Subject-related | This is my brother. | This is him. |
| Complement | Predicative | Object-related | They made her a manager. | Make it me. |
| Complement | Extraposed subject | | It's amazing the amount of money he spends. | |
| Determinative with an NP | | | the box's top | its top |
| Adjunct | Modifier | | Try again Monday. | I did it myself. |
| Adjunct | Supplement | | I met the host, a linguist. | I met the host, her. |

Nominals (see Internal structure, below), also appear as pre-head modifier in a nominal (e.g., a two day conference).

=== Internal structure ===
A simple noun phrase like some good ideas has a head nominal, a phrase that excludes any determinative (here, some), and that nominal, in turn, has a head noun (here ideas) along with any modifiers or complements. Roughly speaking, the nominal includes everything after the determinative (similar to the way a clause has a verb phrase that includes basically everything after the subject). The following tree shows the internal structure of an NP with all the main types of dependents: modifiers, a determinative, a predeterminative (labeled here as a kind of modifier), and a complement. (The triangles are a convention to simplify the representation of the inner structures of phrases when it is less relevant.)

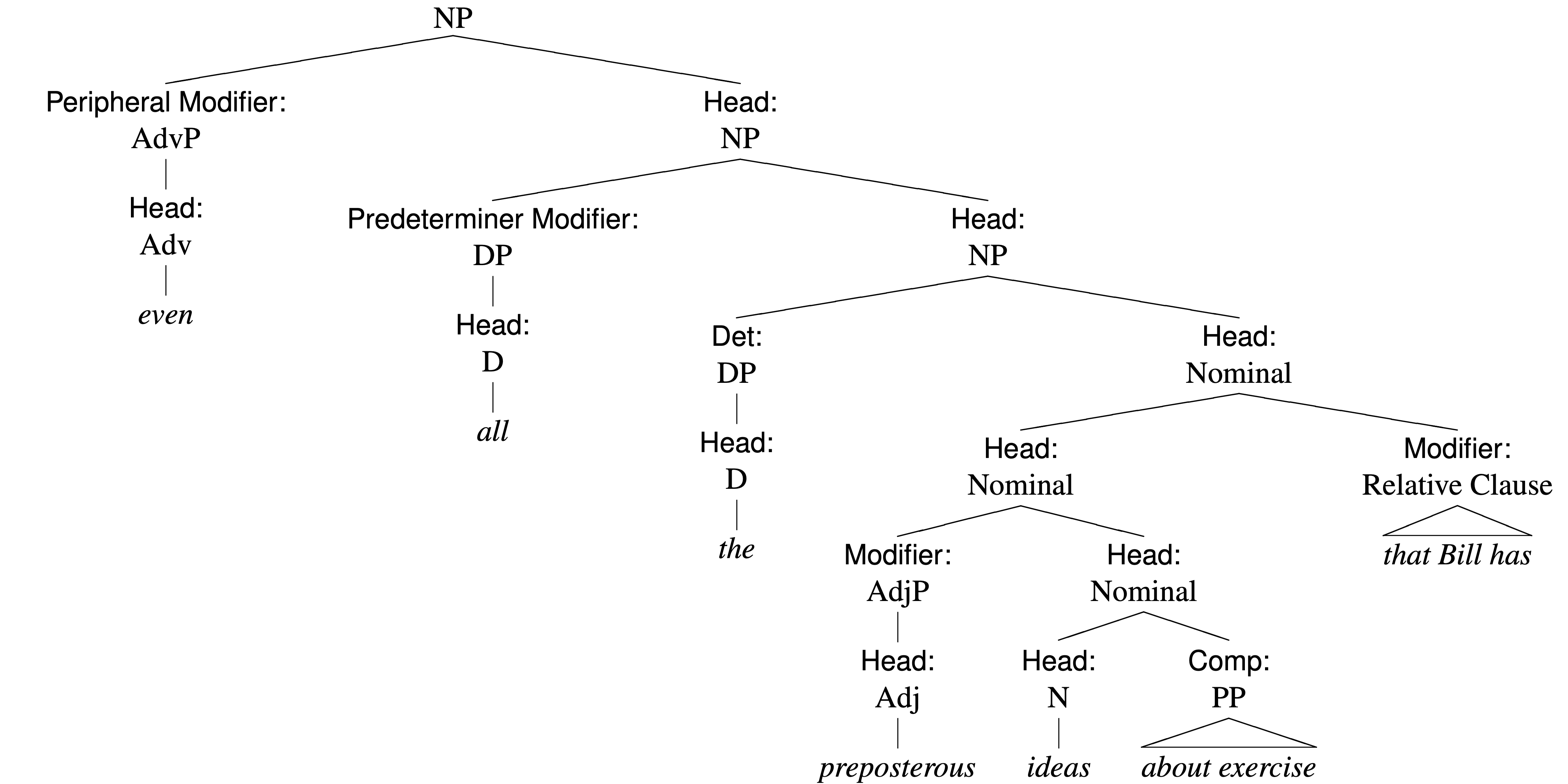
A tree diagram for the NP "even all the preposterous ideas about exercise that Bill has"

==== Determinatives ====
A basic English NP splits into an optional determinative (usually a determiner phrase or a genitive NP) and a head nominal (e.g., [many] [good people]). In the diagram above, the determinative is the, and the head nominal is preposterous ideas about exercise that Bill has. The determinative, if present, always precedes the nominal and is licensed by the head noun. That is, it must agree in number and countability (e.g., many people, *many person, some police, *a police) with the head noun.

Though the determinative function is typically realized by determiner phrases, they may also be realized by other phrases. Noun phrases that realize the determinative function are typically in the genitive case (e.g., your interview) but do not need to be (e.g., this size home). Determiners can also be realized by prepositional phrases, such as up to a dozen in the noun phrase up to a dozen agencies.

==== Predeterminatives ====
Inside the NP, but outside the nominal, there are also predeterminatives, as exemplified by all in the tree diagram above. All here has a specifying rather than a modifying role in the noun phrase, much like the determinative the, but the determinative function has already been filled. To account for noun phrases like these, some grammars (such as Oxford Modern English Grammar and A Comprehensive Grammar of the English Language) also recognize the function of predeterminative (or predeterminer). Other grammars offer different accounts of these constructions. For example, the Cambridge Grammar of the English Language classifies them as a "predeterminer modifier".

Like the determinative function, the predeterminative function is typically realized by determiner phrases. However, they can also be realized by noun phrases (e.g., three times the speed) and adverb phrases (e.g., twice the population).

==== Modifiers ====
Inside the nominal, modifiers can be divided into pre-head (before the noun) and post-head (after the noun). Adjective phrases are the prototypical pre-head modifiers of nouns, as exemplified by preposterous in the tree diagram above. Adjective-like prepositional phrases can also function as pre-head modifiers of nouns. For example, the prepositional phrase under threat functions as a pre-head modifier in the noun phrase the under-threat postal service. The adjective-like nature of these prepositional phrases is indicated by the tendency for them to be hyphenated in writing and the fact that they can typically be paraphrased with an adjective phrase (compare the endangered postal service). Similarly, adjective-like clauses can function as pre-head modifiers of nouns. In the noun phrase pay-as-you-go SIM card, for instance, the clause pay as you go functions as a pre-head modifier. Like the adjective-like prepositions, these clauses tend to be hyphenated in writing.

Other pre-head modifiers of nouns include nominals. In the noun phrase Nirvana's classic early nineties album, for example, the nominal early nineties modifies the noun album. The nominal's status a modifier can be made clearer by paraphrasing the noun phrase that contains it: Nirvana's classic album from the early nineties, in which from the early nineties is more clearly a modifier. Verb phrases can also function as pre-head modifiers of nouns. For instance, the verb phrase regularly dripping can function as a pre-head modifier in the noun phrase a regularly dripping faucet. The fact that dripping can be and is modified by a manner adverb (regularly) but cannot be modified by a degree adverb (such as very) indicates that these pre-head modifiers are verb phrases rather than adjective phrases because verbs can typically be modified by manner but not degree adverbs while adjectives can typically be modified by degree but not manner adverbs. Another pre-head modifier of nouns is determiner phrases. For example, the determiner phrase two in the noun phrase these two images functions as a pre-head modifier. While determiners that occur before nouns tend to function as determinatives, noun phrases can contain only one determinative, so additional determiner phrases must have some other function. In these two images, the determiner phrase these fills the determinative function, so the additional determiner phrase two must instead be analyzed as a pre-head modifier. Some grammars label these determiner phrases postdeterminers. Rarely, an adverb phrase can function as a pre-head modifier of nouns. In the noun phrase an almost victory, for example, the adverb phrase almost functions as a pre-head modifier.

Relative clauses, as exemplified by that Bill has in the tree diagram above, are common as post-head modifiers. Prepositional phrases are another common variety of post-head modifier. In the noun phrase an apple in a tree, for example, the prepositional phrase in a tree functions as a post-head modifier. Adjective phrases can also function as post-head modifiers. Some of these adjective phrases are reduced relative clauses, such as balloons full of helium (compare balloons that were full of helium). Others are post-positive adjective phrases, such as the attorney general. Noun phrases themselves can function as post-head adjuncts in noun phrases. In the noun phrase shoes that size, for instance, the noun phrase that size functions as a post-head modifier. Certain determiners (namely, each, enough, less, and more) can head determiner phrases that function as post-head modifiers of noun phrases, as in the determiner phrase each in three dollars each. Rarely, adverb phrases can function as post-head modifiers, such as the adverb phrase soon in the noun phrase some day soon.

External modifiers exist inside the NP but outside the nominal. These modifiers are often adverb phrases, as exemplified by even in the tree diagram above. External modifiers can also be realized by prepositional phrases (e.g., by far the greatest ally) and noun phrases (e.g., every bit a philosopher). External modifiers can only attach to the beginnings or ends of noun phrases. When positioned at the beginning, they occur before any predeterminative, determinative, or internal modifier. In the noun phrase even all their best songs, for instance, the external modifier (even) must occur before the predeterminative (all), determinative (their), and internal modifier (best). Some external modifiers can move freely between the beginning and the end of their noun phrase. For example, by far the greatest ally can also be written the greatest ally by far.

==== Complements ====
A nominal can occasionally include a complement, a dependent licensed by the head noun. Usually, these are prepositional phrases or subordinate clauses. The head of such prepositional phrases is typically of, as in our review of your application or your receipt of the envelope. In some of these, the complement and noun can be compared to a verb and direct object pair (we reviewed your application; you received the envelope). In others, the head is not of, as exemplified by about exercise in the tree diagram above. Clauses that function as complements in noun phrases can be either finite (a realization that it is important) or non-finite (a requirement for them to do it). As with prepositional phrase complements of nouns, certain clause complements of nouns can be compared to verb and complement pairs (they realized that it is important; somebody required them to do it).

Nouns can also be complemented by noun phrases. Unusually, these noun phrase complements occur before the head noun. For example, the noun phrase kinesiology functions as a pre-head complement in the larger noun phrase a kinesiology student. The noun phrase's status a complement can be made clearer by paraphrasing the noun phrase that contains it: a student of kinesiology, in which of kinesiology is more clearly a complement.

When there is a complement, usually there's only one, but up to three are possible (e.g., a bet for $10 with DJ that it wasn't true.)

=== Order of elements in noun phrases ===
The Cambridge Grammar of the English Language proposes the following rigid order of elements within noun phrases: pre-head external modifiers (peripheral modifiers and predeterminatives), determinatives, pre-head internal modifiers, pre-head complement, head, post-head internal dependents, and post-head external modifiers (emphatic reflexives and focusing modifiers). These elements are present in the example below:

| even | all | the | very happy | linguistics | students | at the university | themselves | too |
| peripheral modifier | predeterminative | determinative | pre-head internal modifier | pre-head complement | head | post-head internal dependent | emphatic reflexive | focusing modifier |

These ordering constraints are called rigid because violating them results in an ungrammatical noun phrase. For example, the very happy linguistics students could not become the linguistics very happy students. Other ordering constraints are labile, meaning that they reflect the general order of things but may be violated without producing an ungrammatical phrase. For example, pre-head internal modifiers that indicate age typically occur before those that indicate color (e.g. the new blue tie), but this order can be violated for various reasons without producing an ungrammatical phrase (e.g., The blue new tie is a possible answer to the question Which new tie will you wear?). Pre-head internal modifiers and post-head internal dependents are subject to labile ordering constraints.

==== Order of pre-head internal modifiers ====
Much attention has been given to the order of pre-noun internal modifiers in both academic and popular writings on English grammar. Many proposed orders appeal to semantic categories. The Cambridge Grammar of the English Language, for example, proposes the following order for residual pre-head modifiers: evaluative (e.g., good, annoying), general property (e.g., big, cruel), age (e.g., new, ancient), color (e.g., black, crimson), provenance (e.g., French, Chinese), manufacture (e.g., cotton, carved), type (e.g., passenger aircraft, men's department). Mark Forsyth suggests that adjectives must occur in the following order: opinion, size, age, shape, color, origin, material, purpose. These orders are similar to the order as analyzed by Charles Darling, which offers this order: observation, size, shape, age, color, origin, material, qualifier. The following table summarizes these orders:

| Cambridge | evaluative | general property | | age | color | provenance | manufacture | type |
| Darling | opinion | size | shape | age | color | origin | material | qualifier |
| Forsyth | observation | size | age | shape | color | origin | material | purpose |

These ordering constraints correctly predict noun phrases like a beautiful old Italian touring car, in which beautiful is evaluative (or opinion/observation), old an age, Italian an origin (or provenance), and touring a type (or purpose/qualifier). However, Mark Liberman notes that these ordering constraints can lead to incorrect predictions: ugly is an opinion and big a size, but corpus data shows that big ugly is far more common than ugly big. Liberman also notes that these orders fail to account for strong preferences within categories. For example, long and tall are both sizes, but long tall is generally preferred to tall long.

Stefanie Wulff summarizes and evaluates a variety of other factors that predict the order of pre-head modifiers in English noun phrases. From a phonological perspective, shorter modifiers typically occur before longer ones, other things being equal. For example, the long intelligent book is generally preferred to the intelligent long book. From a semantic perspective, the more inherent qualities of a thing tend to occur closer to the noun. For instance, solid stainless steel is generally preferred to stainless solid steel because the stainlessness of stainless steel is more inherent than the solidness of solid steel. Also from a semantic perspective, modifiers that "are less dependent on comparison are put nearer to the head noun." For example, the redness of a file can be determined without comparing it to another file but the smallness of a file can only be determined by comparison with another file. Thus, a small red file is generally preferable to a red small file. From a pragmatic perspective, modifiers that "are remembered most easily upon the occurrence of the noun" tend to occur closer to the noun. For instance, blonde tends to be more closely associated with hair than nice is, so nice blonde hair is more likely than blonde nice hair. Also from a pragmatic perspective, more frequently used modifiers tend to occur before less frequently used modifiers. For example, big is a more frequently used word than cold, so we would expect a big cold lake rather than a cold big lake.

Some grammars have proposed multiple "zones" for pre-head modifiers in English noun phrases. A Comprehensive Grammar of the English Language, for example, proposes four "premodification zones." The pre-central zone is filled by nongradable adjectives, particularly intensifiers such as major and numerous. The central zone consists of the most prototypical adjectives, that is, adjectives that admit intensifiers and comparison and can also appear in predicate position. Within this central zone, evaluative adjectives typically occur first, and the usual order for the rest is nonderived adjectives, then adjectives derived from verbs, and finally adjectives derived from nouns. The post-central zone includes participles and color terms. The pre-head zone includes adjectives denoting provenance, adjectives with the meaning of "relating to (noun)" (such as annual and political), and nouns. The Cambridge Grammar of the English Language proposes two zones: early pre-head modifiers and residual pre-head modifiers. Early pre-head modifiers include cardinal and ordinal numbers numerals (e.g., two, second), superlative adjectives (e.g., largest, youngest), and primacy adjectives (e.g., key, primary). Residual pre-head modifiers include all other pre-head internal modifiers.

==== Order of post-head internal dependents ====
The category "post-head internal dependents" includes post-head modifiers and complements. Though modifiers tend not to occur between complements and their heads, The Cambridge Grammar of the English Language does not characterize this tendency as a rigid ordering constraint because the order is also affected by the weight of the constituent, with lighter dependents typically occurring before heavy dependents. In the noun phrase the rumor in the city that Minakshi had decreed that no white woman could live for long within sight of her temple, for example, the modifier in the city separates the head rumor from the complement that Minakshi had decreed that no white woman could live for long within sight of her temple because the complement is relatively heavy while the modifier is relatively light.

== Nouns versus other lexical categories ==
=== Adjectives ===
Nouns and adjectives in English can generally be distinguished by their grammatical features: Prototypical nouns can inflect for number while adjectives cannot. Prototypical adjectives can inflect for degree of comparison while nouns cannot. Prototypical nouns head phrases that can function as subject, direct object, and indirect object while prototypical adjectives head phrases that can function as pre-head modifier of nouns and subject-related complement. Prototypical adjectives can be modified by very while nouns cannot. Nouns can head phrases containing determinatives and predeterminatives while adjectives cannot. The following table summarizes some of these characteristics:

| | Nouns | Adjectives |
|---|---|---|
| Inflection | number (plural -s) | comparative (-er), superlative (-est) |
| Typical functions | subject, direct object, indirect object | pre-head modifier of noun, subject-related complement |
| Typical pre-head modifier | adjective phrase | adverb phrase |
| Occurrence with determinatives | head phrases containing determinatives | do not head phrases containing determinatives |

In noun phrases such as the boy actor, words like boy do not fall neatly into the categories noun or adjective. Boy is more like an adjective than a noun in that it functions as a pre-head modifier of a noun, which is a function prototypically filled by adjective phrases, and in that that it cannot be pluralized in this position (*the boys actor). However, boy is more like a noun than an adjective in that it cannot be modified by very (*the very boy actor) as adjectives typically can be and in that it cannot be separated from the head noun by an adjective (*the boy talented actor). Further, boy is more like a noun in that it cannot occur alone as a subject-related predicative complement (*the actor is boy). The Cambridge Grammar of the English Language classifies words like boy as nouns. John Robert Ross similarly classifies it as an "adjectival noun", a noun with some adjectival properties.

Color terms also exhibit features of both nouns and adjectives. Often, the category of these terms can be clearly identified. For example, color terms used as subjects (blue represents hope) or complements (my favorite color is blue) appear to be typical nouns while color terms occurring attributively (the blue light) appear to be typical adjectives. Similarly, color terms marked as plural (the blues in his paintings) appear to be nouns while those marked as comparative (bluer) or superlative (bluest) appear to be adjectives. However, James D. McCawley notes an example of a color term appearing to have features of both nouns and adjectives: a deep blue necktie. Here, the modifier of blue is an adjective (deep) rather than an adverb (deeply), which suggests that the color term is a noun. However, its function appears to be the same as the adjective blue in the blue light. Bas Aarts notes that this apparent dual categorization can be avoided by treating phrases like deep blue as adjective-adjective compounds.

Phrases like the lucky in the lucky don't need to diet also present challenges. Words like lucky in this case have features typical of a noun; specifically, they appear to head phrases that (1) contain determinatives and (2) have the prototypical functions of noun phrases (such as subject, in this example). However, these words also have features of adjectives. For instance, they can be modified by very (the very lucky don't need to diet) and combine with morphemes that can typically attach only to adjectives, such as un- (the unlucky must diet). Complicating matters further, they can take as pre-head modifiers either adjectives (the ostentatious rich) or adverbs (the completely innocent). Aarts argues that phrases like these are best analyzed as noun phrases with an empty element functioning as the head, yielding an analysis like this: [_{NP} the [_{AP} completely_{Adv} innocent_{Adj}] ∅_{N}]. The Cambridge Grammar of the English Language offers a similar analysis, calling words like lucky and innocent as used here "fused modifier-heads". In other words, they treat these words as adjectives that have fused with an unexpressed head.

=== Verbs ===
In English, nouns and verbs can typically be distinguished according to their grammatical features: Prototypical nouns can inflect for number while verbs cannot. Verbs take a variety of inflectional endings that nouns cannot, such as the -ing suffix of the present participle form. Nouns typically take prepositional phrases and clauses as complements while verbs typically take noun phrases and clauses as complements. The typical pre-head modifiers of nouns are adjective phrases, but the typical pre-head modifiers of verbs are adverb phrases. Nouns can head phrases containing determinatives and predeterminatives while verbs cannot. The following table summarizes some of these characteristics:

| | Nouns | Verbs |
|---|---|---|
| Inflection | number (plural -s) | tense (-s, -ed), participle (-ing, -ed or -en) |
| Typical functions | subject, direct object, indirect object | predicator |
| Typical complements | prepositional phrase, clause | noun phrase, clause |
| Typical pre-head modifier | adjective phrase | adverb phrase |
| Occurrence with determinatives | head phrases containing determinatives | do not head phrases containing determinatives |

Certain words derived from nouns, specifically those ending in -ing (such as painting), can share features of both nouns and verbs. A Comprehensive Grammar of the English Language illustrates the gradience from verbal nouns to verbs in their present participle forms, with the earlier examples behaving more like nouns and the later examples behaving more like verbs:

1. some paintings of Brown’s
2. Brown’s paintings of his daughters
3. The painting of Brown is as skillful as that of Gainsborough.
4. Brown’s deft painting of his daughter is a delight to watch.
5. Brown’s deftly painting his daughter is a delight to watch.
6. I dislike Brown’s painting his daughter
7. I dislike Brown painting his daughter (when she ought to be at school)
8. I watched Brown painting his daughter.
9. Brown deftly painting his daughter is a delight to watch.
10. Painting his daughter, Brown noticed that his hand was shaking.
11. Brown painting his daughter that day, I decided to go for a walk.
12. The man painting the girl is Brown.
13. The silently painting man is Brown.
14. Brown is painting his daughter.

Painting(s) in [1]–[4] are unambiguously nouns. Paintings in [1] and [2] feature the plural -s morpheme associated with nouns and also head phrases containing determinatives (i.e., some and Brown's), a feature also observed in [3]–[5]. Painting in [4] is also modified by an adjective phrase (deft), further suggesting that it is a noun. Meanwhile, painting in [10]–[14] are unambiguously verbs. Of these, all but [13] take post-head noun phrase complements, a feature of verbs but not nouns. While the painting in [13] does not take a noun phrase complement, it is modified by an adverb phrase (silently), a feature typical of verbs that is also present in [5] and [9]. The troublesome cases are those represented by the paintings in [5]–[9], which demonstrate features of both nouns and verbs. These are often called gerunds (though the terminology can vary). The paintings in [5]–[9] are noun-like in that they are the heads of phrases functioning as either subject or direct object. The paintings in [5] and [6] are even more noun-like in that they occur with the determinative Brown's. However, the paintings in [5]–[9] are also verb-like in that they take a post-head noun phrase complement. The painting in [9] is even more verb-like in that it is modified by the adverb phrase deftly.

Linguists have offered a variety of accounts for English gerunds. For instance, Geoffrey K. Pullum and James P. Blevins both argue that gerunds are noun phrases with verb phrase heads. Other linguists, such as Richard Hudson, argue that gerunds are both verbs and nouns. Yet others, such as Bas Aarts, argue that the fact that gerunds tend to occur in the same places as noun phrases (as subject, direct object, and so on) is not enough to support that they occur within noun phrases and instead treat them as verbs that happen to be in non-canonical positions.

=== Adverbs ===
There is typically little confusion between nouns and adverbs in English because there is no overlap in the inflectional morphology that they take (-s for nouns, -er and -est for adverbs) and they tend to cooccur with different kinds of words (e.g., nouns can head phrases containing determinatives while adverbs cannot). Further, nouns and adverbs tend to head phrases with different prototypical functions: noun phrases typically function as subjects, direct objects, and indirect objects while adverb phrases typically function as adjuncts.

| | Nouns | Adverbs |
|---|---|---|
| Inflection | number (plural -s) | comparative (-er), superlative (-est) |
| Typical functions | subject, direct object, indirect object | adjunct |
| Occurrence with determinatives | head phrases containing determinatives | do not head phrases containing determinatives |

Despite no overlap in the form and distribution of nouns and adverbs, some linguists suggest gradience between a certain class of nouns and adverbs. For example, Barbara M. H. Strang notes that words such as yesterday and today have features of both nouns and adverbs. They are noun like in that they can occupy typical noun phrase positions and head genitive noun phrases (e.g., yesterday's news), but unlike prototypical nouns, they cannot be made plural and do not head phrases contain determinatives. Bas Aarts notes that this argument does not actually assert any adverb-like properties but rather just a lack of certain properties of nouns, suggesting that words like yesterday and today are nouns, albeit less prototypical than some nouns.

=== Determiners ===
There is typically little confusion between nouns and determiners in English, but certain words, namely you and we, share features of both pronouns and determiners in certain constructions, as in we students know the truth. These words resemble pronouns in that they show case contrast (compare us students), a feature that, in Modern English, is typical of pronouns but not determiners. Because they resemble pronouns in this way, Evelyne Delorme and Ray C. Dougherty treat words like us as pronouns in apposition with the noun phrases that follow them, which is an analysis that Merriam–Webster's Dictionary of English Usage also follows. Richard Hudson and Mariangela Spinillo also categorize these words as pronouns but do not assume an appositive relationship between the pronoun and the rest of the noun phrase.

However, two other features make these words resemble determiners rather than nouns. First, their phrase-initial position (we students) is typical of determiners (the students). Second, they cannot combine with other determiners (*the we students), which suggests that they fill the same role. These characteristics have led linguists like Ray Jackendoff and Steven Paul Abney to categorize such uses of we and you as determiners. The Cambridge Grammar of the English Language similarly classifies this use of we and you as "an extended, secondary use" in which words that began as pronouns have been reanalyzed as determiners.
