= David Denison =

British linguist (born 1950)

David Michael Benjamin Denison FBA (born 6 September 1950) is a British linguist whose work focuses on the history of the English language.

== Biography ==
He was educated at Highgate School and St John's College, Cambridge, where he studied mathematics and then Anglo-Saxon, Norse and Celtic, completing the latter tripos with an upper second-class degree in 1973. He earned his doctorate at Lincoln College, Oxford on "Aspects of the History of English Group-Verbs, with Particular Attention to the Syntax of the Ormulum". He was Smith Professor of English Language & Medieval Literature at the University of Manchester from 2008. Since March 2015 he has been Professor Emeritus of English Linguistics. He is a past president of the International Society for the Linguistics of English (ISLE).

Denison served from 1995 to 2010 as one of the founding editors, with Bas Aarts and Richard Hogg, of the journal English Language and Linguistics. In 2014 he was awarded an honorary doctorate from the Faculty of Languages at Uppsala University. In 2014 he was also elected a Fellow of the British Academy, the United Kingdom's national academy for the humanities and social sciences.

He is one of the contributors to The Cambridge grammar of the English language.

== Selected publications ==
- R. Hogg, D. Denison (eds.). 2006. A History of the English Language. Cambridge Univ. Press.
- B. Aarts, D. Denison, E. Keizer, G. Popova (eds.) 2004. Fuzzy Grammar: a reader. Oxford Univ. Press.
- D. Denison. 1999. "Gradience and linguistic change". In Historical Linguistics. Ed. L. Brinton. John Benjamins.
- D. Denison. 1998. "Syntax". In The Cambridge History of the English Language. Vol. IV: 1776–1997. Ed. S. Romaine. Cambridge Univ. Press, pp. 92–329.
- D. Denison. 1993. English Historical Syntax: Verbal Constructions. Longman.
