= International Society for the Linguistics of English =

The International Society for the Linguistics of English (ISLE), founded in 2008, is a learned society of linguists. The organization's goals are to promote the study of the English Language at an international level, with a particular focus on the structure and history of standard as well as the many non-standard varieties of English, examining both their form and function. To that end, the society aims to provide a geographically and theoretically neutral central contact point for scholars who identify with these aims by including both academic linguists and members of the educated public who have an interest in English linguistics. The society allows scholars the opportunity convene beyond borders of members' country-specific professional societies (e.g., British Association for Applied Linguistics (BAAL), American Association for Applied Linguistics (AAAL), etc.). Any person may become an ISLE member by contacting the Secretary and paying dues.

A thematic volume on world Englishes published seven of the papers which were originally presented at the second conference. The society's official affiliated publication is the journal English Language and Linguistics, published by Cambridge University Press.

The inaugural ISLE conference was hosted by the University of Freiburg in October 2008, attracting scholars from 28 countries. Since their founding, the society has held triennial conferences at the University of Freiburg (Germany) in 2008; at Boston University (USA) in 2011; at the University of Zurich (Switzerland) in 2014;, at Adam Mickiewicz University in Poznań (Poland) in 2016), and at the Institute of English Studies in London in 2018. Dr. Geoffrey Leech was a contributor to the organization from the first meeting, where he organized a workshop entitled 'Watching English Grammar Change'. Upon hearing of his death five days before the 2014 conference, the ISLE dedicated its 24–27 August 2014 conference to his memory.

Annually since 2008 the society has sponsored the Richard M. Hogg Prize, awarded to the best paper by a junior scholar on any research-related topic in English language or English linguistics. The award was named for a prolific scholar and editor who was a professor of English Language and Medieval Literature at the University of Manchester until his death in 2007.

The current president of the ISLE is Professor of English Philology at the University of Glasgow Jeremy J. Smith.
