= Sidney Greenbaum =

British linguist and grammarian (1929–1996)

Sidney Greenbaum (31 December 1929 – 28 May 1996) was a British scholar of the English language and of linguistics. He was Quain Professor of English language and literature at University College London from 1983 to 1990 and Director of the Survey of English Usage, 1983–96. With Randolph Quirk and others, he wrote A Comprehensive Grammar of the English Language (Longman 1985). He also wrote the Oxford English Grammar (Oxford, 1996). Greenbaum studied at Jews' College, London, and was a qualified minister of religion although he never held a paid ministerial position.

== Personal life ==
According to the Oxford Dictionary of National Biography entry on Greenbaum, "In 1990 Greenbaum resigned the Quain chair at University College following his conviction in London of a number of charges of sexual assault on young boys." Novelist Naomi Alderman has identified Greenbaum as having groomed and abused her when she was a child. In 2023 Jewish News reported that the United Synagogue had urged its member communities to cross out Greenbaum's name from its mention in the 1990 Singer’s Prayer Book. Its chief executive, Jo Grose, said: “As a convicted child sex abuser, his name has no place in our holy books.”

== Collections ==
Greenbaum's personal archive is held at University College London. The collection includes papers relating to his work, lecture notes, and working drafts of publications.

== Selected bibliography ==
All cited to: Gibney, Marie (December 1997), "Bibliography of the writings of Sidney Greenbaum", Journal of English Linguistics, 25 (4): 280–286, doi:10.1177/007542429702500403, S2CID 143748337

- 1970 Greenbaum, Sidney (2012) [1970]. Verb-Intensifier Collocations in English: An Experimental Approach. Walter de Gruyter; original publisher, Mouton. ISBN 978-3-11-088642-9.
- 1972 (with Randolph Quirk, Geoffrey Leech, and Jan Svartvik). A Grammar of Contemporary English. London: Longman.
- 1973 (with Randolph Quirk). A University Grammar of English. London: Longman;
- 1985 (with Randolph Quirk, Geoffrey Leech, and Jan Svartvik). A Comprehensive Grammar of the English, Language. London: Longman.
- 1986 (with Janet Whitcut). The Complete Plain Words by Sir Ernest Gowers (3rd ed.). London: HMSO; Harmondsworth, Middlesex: Penguin Books; Boston: David R. Godine, 1988.
- 1988 Good English and the Grammarian. Longman. 1988. ISBN 978-0-582-29148-5.
- 1988 (with Janet Whitcut). The Longman Guide to English Usage. London: Longman. Bookclub hardback edition, London: Guild Publishing
- 1989 Greenbaum, Sidney (1989). A College Grammar of English. Longman. ISBN 978-0-582-28597-2.
- 1990 (with Randolph Quirk). A Student's Grammar of the English Language. Longman. 1990. ISBN 978-0-582-05971-9.
- 1991 An Introduction to English Grammar. London: Longman

- 2013 republished: Nelson, Gerald; Greenbaum, Sidney (2013). An Introduction to English Grammar. Routledge. ISBN 978-1-317-86396-0.

- 1992 (associate editor). The Oxford Companion to the English Language, edited by T. McArthur. Oxford: Oxford University Press
- 1996 Greenbaum, Sidney (1996). The Oxford English Grammar. Oxford University Press. ISBN 978-0-19-861250-6.
- 1996 Comparing English Worldwide: The International Corpus of English. Edition of commissioned papers. Oxford: Clarendon Press.
- 1996 Afterword. In South Asian English: Structure, Use and Users, edited by Robert J. Baumgardner, Urbana: University of Illinois Press.
- 1996 (with Gerald Nelson and Michael Weitzman). "Complement Clauses in English." In Using Corpora for Language Research: Essays in Honour of Geoffrey Leech, edited by M. Short and J. A. Thomas, 6-91. London: Longman.
- 1996 (with Gerald Nelson). Introduction. World Englishes 15:1-3.
- 1996 (with Gerald Nelson). "The International Corpus of English (ICE) Project." World Englishes 15:5-17.
- 1996 (with Ni Yibin). "About the ICE Tagset." Comparing English Worldwide: The International Corpus of English, edited by Sidney Greenbaum, 92–100. Oxford: Clarendon Press.

== Sources ==
- Quirk, Randolph (31 May 1996). "Obituary: Professor Sidney Greenbaum". The Independent.
- Aarts, Bas; Alderman, Geoffrey. "Greenbaum, Salman Mendel [Sidney]". Oxford Dictionary of National Biography (online ed.). Oxford University Press. doi:10.1093/ref:odnb/63077. (Subscription, Wikipedia Library access or UK public library membership required.)
