= Richard Milne Hogg =

Scottish historian of the English language (1944–2007)

Richard Milne Hogg, FBA, FRSE (20 May 1944 – 6 September 2007) was a Scottish linguist who was well known for his research on Old English, phonology, and English dialects. He received his Ph.D. from Edinburgh University in 1975 presenting the thesis Determiner and quantifier systems in contemporary English under the supervision of Angus McIntosh and John Anderson. He was initially a lecturer in English at the University of Amsterdam from 1969 to 1973, then taught at the University of Lancaster; from 1980 until his death in 2007 he was Smith Professor of English Language and Medieval Literature at the University of Manchester. He served as dean of the arts faculty at Manchester from 1990 to 1993.

Hogg was the General Editor of The Cambridge History of the English Language (six volumes, published between 1992 and 2001). In 1997 he became one of the founding editors, with Bas Aarts and David Denison, of the journal English Language and Linguistics. His Grammar of Old English, 2, Morphology, was completed after his death by Rob Fulk and published in 2011. A collection of essays in Hogg's honour, Analysing Older English, was published in 2012. In 2008, a fellowship for young scholars was set up in his name, sponsored by the International Society for the Linguistics of English.

Hogg was elected as a fellow of the British Academy in 1994. In 2004 he became a fellow of the Royal Society of Edinburgh.

== Selected publications ==
- R. M. Hogg, R.D. Fulk - 2011. A Grammar of Old English, Volume 2: Morphology.
- R. M. Hogg. 1992. A Grammar of Old English: Vol. 1.
- R. M. Hogg. 1992. "3 Phonology and Morphology." The Cambridge history of the English language.
- R. M. Hogg and C.B. McCully. 1987. Metrical phonology: a course book.
- R. M. Hogg. 1977. English quantifier systems.
