= English Language and Linguistics =

- Discipline: Linguistics
- Language: English
- Edited by: Laurel J. Brinton, Bernd Kortmann, Warren Maguire

Publication details
- History: 1997-present
- Publisher: Cambridge University Press (United Kingdom)
- Frequency: Biannually

Standard abbreviations
- ISO 4: Engl. Lang. Linguist.

Indexing
- ISSN: 1360-6743 (print); 1469-4379 (web)
- OCLC no.: 49377090

Links
- Journal homepage

English Language and Linguistics is a peer-reviewed academic journal covering linguistics and published three times a year by Cambridge University Press.

The founding editors were Bas Aarts (1995–2012), David Denison (1995–2010), and Richard Hogg (1995–2007).
