= Reference Reviews =

- Discipline: Reference works
- Language: English

Publication details
- History: 1987–2018
- Publisher: Emerald Group Publishing (United Kingdom)
- Frequency: 8/year

Standard abbreviations
- ISO 4: Ref. Rev.

Indexing
- ISSN: 0950-4125 (print); 1758-7697 (web)
- LCCN: 90644079
- OCLC no.: 310916705

Links
- Journal homepage

Reference Reviews was a British academic journal published by Emerald Group Publishing which provided reviews of reference works with a target audience of librarians. It was established in 1987 by Nick Moore (Birmingham City University), aiming to provide "unbiased, comparative, and evaluative reviews" of reference materials, primarily British publications. Its first issue was published in March that year by Parker Moore Ltd. and edited by Nick Moore. The publication was acquired by the publisher Longman in 1988, and later by Emerald (then known as MCB University Press). Under its second editor Stuart James, the journal went from publishing four issues a year to eight issues a year and also began to be provided on the Internet. Its third editor, Tony Chalcraft, announced the end of the journal in its final issue in 2018.

== Categories ==
The journal reviewed dictionaries and encyclopedias of either a generalist or specialist nature. Reviews of the specialist reference works were categorized under the following headers:

- Philosophy and religion
- Social sciences
- Business
- Management
- Languages and literature
- Science and technology
- Leisure and sports (Note: Or "leisure and sport")
- Geography
- Biography
- History
- Area studies
