= English adjectives =

Adjectives in the English language

English adjectives form a large open category of words in English which, semantically, tend to denote properties such as size, colour, mood, quality, age, etc. with such members as other, big, new, good, different, Cuban, sure, important, and right. Adjectives head adjective phrases, and the most typical members function as modifiers in noun phrases. Most adjectives either inflect for grade (e.g., big, bigger, biggest) or combine with more and most to form comparatives (e.g., more interesting) and superlatives (e.g., most interesting). They are characteristically modifiable by very (e.g., very small). A large number of the most typical members combine with the suffix -ly to form adverbs (e.g., final + ly: finally). Most adjectives function as complements in verb phrases (e.g., It looks good), and some license complements of their own (e.g., happy that you're here).

== Syntax ==
=== Internal structure ===
An adjective phrase (AdjP) is headed by an adjective and optionally takes dependents. AdjPs can take modifiers, which are usually pre-head adverb phrases (e.g., truly wonderful) or post-head preposition phrases (e.g., too big for you; afraid of the dark). The following tree diagram in the style of The Cambridge Grammar of the English Language shows the AdjP very happy to try, with the adverb very as a modifier and the clause to try as a complement.

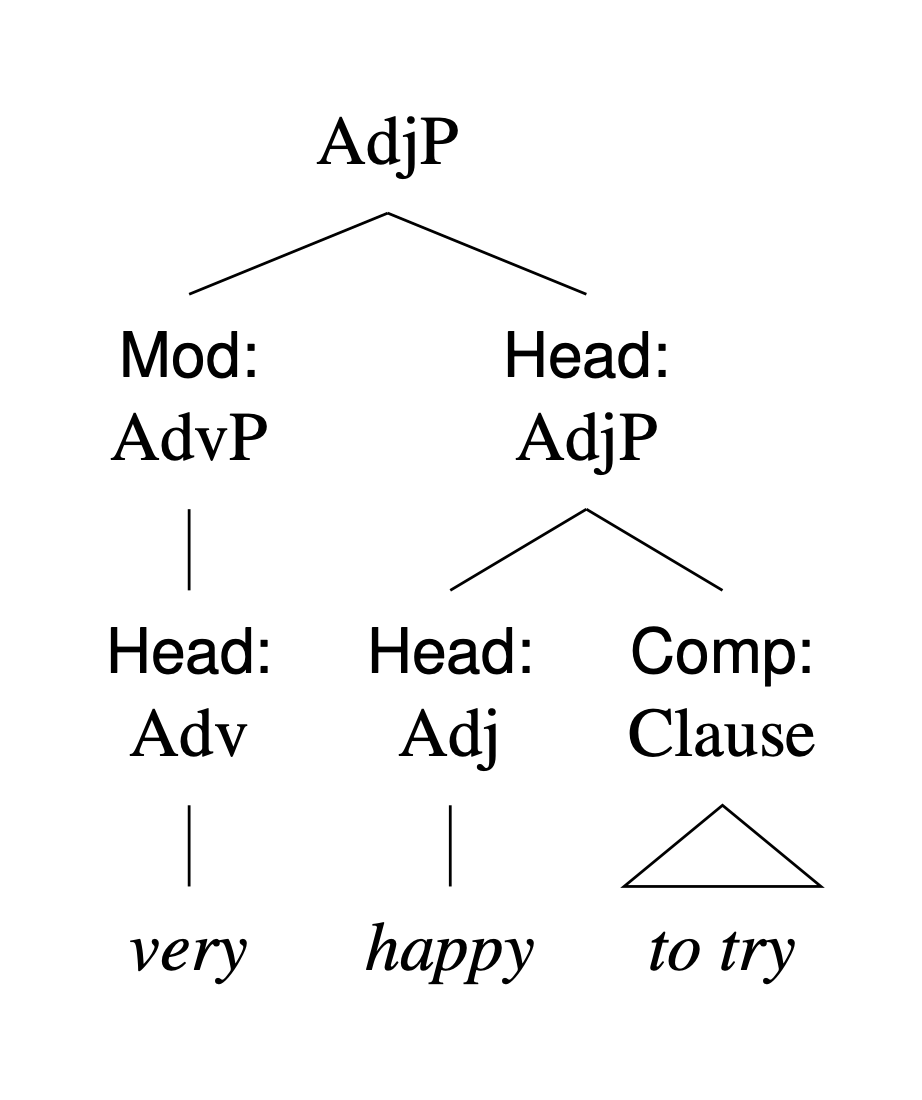

==== Complements of adjectives ====
English adjectives can take clauses, preposition phrases, and noun phrases as complements. Clause complements in adjective phrases can be either finite or nonfinite. Finite clause complements can be declarative (e.g., very pleased that I had bought his book) or interrogative (e.g., not sure whether I want to keep reading). Nonfinite clause complements can occur with a subject (e.g., happy for you to prove me wrong) or without a subject (e.g., eager to please). Adjectives that take preposition phrase complements license preposition phrases headed by fixed prepositions. For example, dependent takes preposition phrase complements headed only by on or upon. In some cases, a complement is obligatory; I'm loath to admit it is fine, but *I'm loath is incomplete. (Note: This article uses asterisks to indicate ungrammatical examples.) A small number of adjectives (due, like, near, unlike, and worth) can take noun phrases as complements. For example, worth can function as the head of an adjective phrase with a noun phrase complement (e.g., worth a second chance).

==== Modifiers of adjectives ====
The prototypical pre-head modifiers of English adjectives are adverb phrases headed by degree adverbs, such as very and too. For example, the adjective tall can be modified by the adverb phrase very. Less common pre-head modifiers in adjective phrases are noun phrases (e.g., six feet long), preposition phrases (e.g., by no means realistic), and determiner phrases (e.g., that small).

Preposition phrases function as post-head modifiers in English adjective phrases. In the adjective phrase foolish in the extreme, for example, the preposition phrase in the extreme functions as a modifier. Less commonly, certain adverbs (indeed and still) and one determiner (enough) can head phrases that function as post-head modifiers in adjective phrases (e.g., very harmful indeed, sweeter still, and fair enough).

=== Functions ===
While adjectives themselves function only as heads in adjective phrases (an AdjP is often a head adjective with no dependents), adjective phrases function at the clause level as predicative complements and predicative adjuncts. At the phrase level, adjective phrases function as modifiers and predeterminatives in noun phrases and complements in some preposition phrases (e.g., they didn't look as good).

==== Predicative complements ====
At the clause level, adjective phrases commonly appear as predicative complements. A predicative complement is a constituent that ascribes a property to a predicand. For example, The dinner was lovely ascribes the property of being lovely to the dinner, the syntactic subject and semantic predicand. Predicative complements may be subject-related, as in the previous example, or object-related, the latter being licensed by complex transitive verbs such as feel and make, as in That made her hungry, where the property of being hungry is ascribed to the syntactic object and semantic predicand, her.

==== Predicative adjuncts ====
Adjective phrases also function as predicative adjuncts in clause structure. Such adjective phrases can be integrated into the clause (e.g., Love dies young) or detached from the clause as a supplement (e.g., Happy to see her, I wept). Adjective phrases functioning as predicative adjuncts are typically interpreted with the subject of the main clause being the predicand of the adjunct (i.e., "I was happy to see her"). When this is not the case, such supplements are often deprecated as dangling modifiers.

==== Modifiers within noun phrases ====
Adjective phrases often function as pre-head (or attributive) modifiers in noun phrases, occurring after any determinative in the noun phrase (NP) (e.g., some nice folks). In some cases they are post-head (or postpositive) modifiers, with particular adjectives like galore (e.g., stories galore) or with certain compound heads like somebody (e.g., somebody special).

==== Predeterminatives within noun phrases ====
Adjective phrases can function as predeterminatives under certain conditions. Specifically, they can do so only in noun phrases with a (or an) functioning as the determinative and only if the adjective phrase either has such or exclamative what as its head or begins with one of a small number of modifiers (i.e., as, how, so, this, that, or too). In the noun phrase such a difficult little devil, for example, the adjective phrase such functions as predeterminative. Similarly, in the clause how important a part is it?, the adjective phrase how important functions as predeterminative.

==== Complements within preposition phrases ====
Adjective phrases can function as complements of preposition phrases. In the clause the film characterized him as childish, for example, the adjective phrase childish functions as the complement of the preposition as.

==== Cases such as the poor and the French ====
In cases such as the very poor and the French which denote a class, traditional grammars see the adjective as being "used as a noun". However, poor cannot actually be a noun here for three reasons: very doesn't modify nouns, there is no possibility to pluralize poor (e.g., *three poors), and most determinatives are impossible (e.g., *a poor could not or *some poor did).

Other grammars see this as a case of ellipsis, where the head noun is simply left out and the AdjP is a regular modifier. In this view, the elided noun is something like one, and the very poor is an elided form of the very poor ones. Other accounts, such as one advanced by Bas Aarts, do not assume ellipsis but instead argue that phrases like these are best analyzed as noun phrases with an empty element functioning as the head, yielding an analysis like this: [_{NP} the [_{AP} very_{Adv} poor_{Adj}] ∅_{N}].

The Cambridge Grammar of the English Language takes such instances to be fused modifier-heads. Under this analysis, adjective phrases may bear two functions at one time, fusing the functions of modifier and head in an NP where no head noun exists. In the noun phrase the very poor, the adjective poor is the fused modifier-head as shown in the tree diagram below.

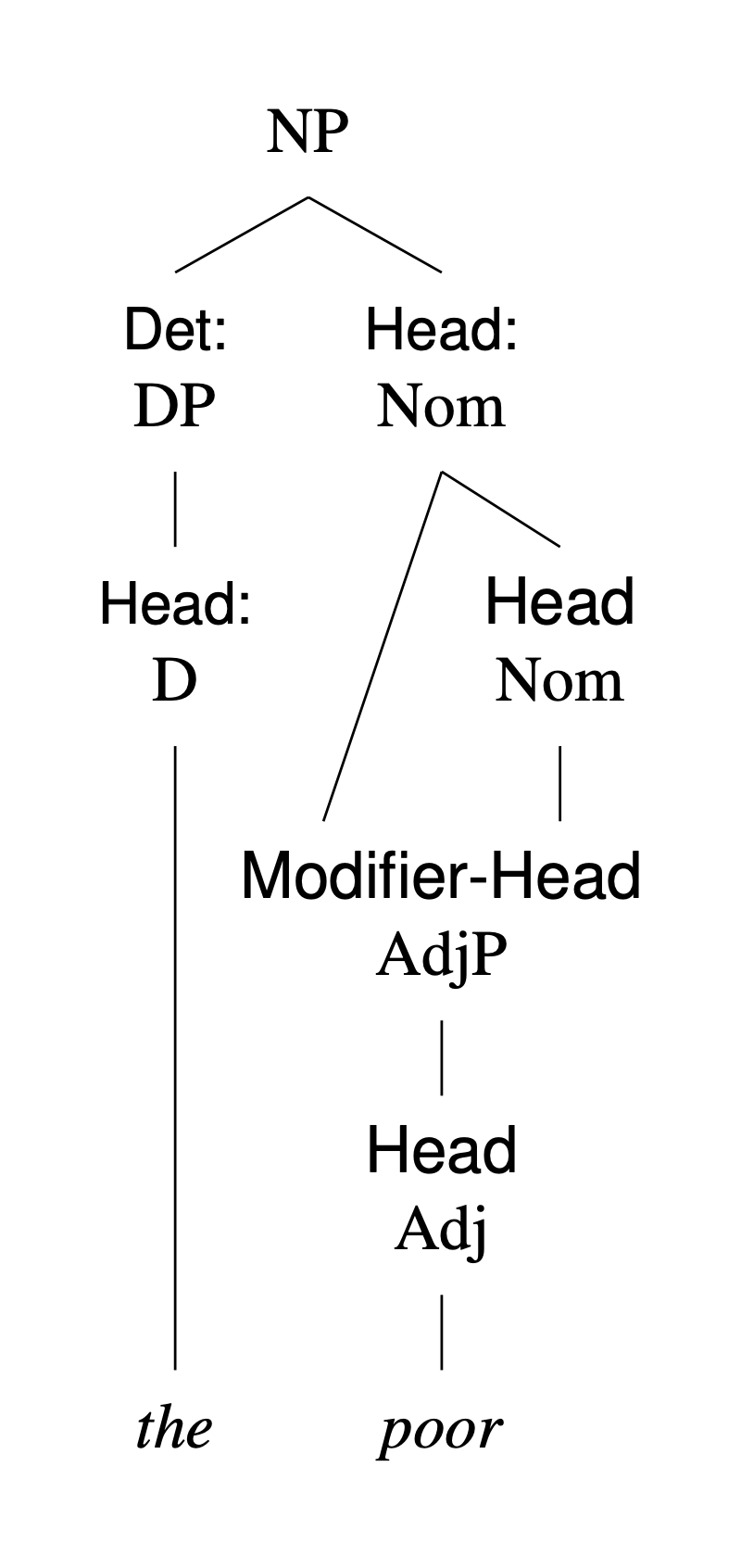

== Types of adjectives ==
=== Non-attributive and non-predicative adjectives ===
While most adjectives can function as both attributive modifier (e.g., a new job) and predicative complement (e.g., the job was new), some are limited to one or the other of these two functions. For example, the adjective drunken cannot be used predicatively (a drunken fool vs *the fool was drunken), while the adjective awake has the opposite limitation (*an awake child vs the child is awake).

It is not only certain adjectives, but also certain constructions that are limited to one function or the other. For instance a nice hot bath is possible, as are the bath is hot and the bath is nice, but *the bath is nice hot is not.

Linguist and historian Peter Matthews observes "that the attributive and predicative uses of adjectives have diverged" and continue to do so. For example, the sense of big in Well, that's big of you from the early 20th century is only possible as a predicative complement.

It has been shown in corpus data that subjective adjectives such as cute are particularly likely to be used as predicative complements, while objective adjectives such as red are more likely to be used as attributive modifiers -- for example, the red dress is cute.

=== Gradable and non-gradable adjectives ===
Most adjectives are gradable, but some are not (e.g., ancillary, bovine, municipal, pubic, first, etc.), or at least have particular senses in which they are not. For example a very Canadian embassy can imply that the embassy has the stereotypically Canadian characteristics (politeness perhaps), but it cannot mean that the embassy represents Canada in the way that a Canadian embassy does.

=== Other types claimed in traditional grammars ===
Many words that have been categorized by traditional grammars as types of adjectives are categorized as belonging to entirely different lexical categories by modern grammars, such as The Cambridge Grammar of the English Language. The types below are mostly of this kind. What these words have in common is, to put it in traditional terms, that they "qualify" nouns. In modern terms, they appear as pre-head dependents in noun phrases. Note that a word may be traditionally assigned to multiple types: for example whose is variously called a possessive adjective, an interrogative adjective, a pronominal adjective, and a relative adjective.

==== Quantitative adjectives ====
Words like many and few, along with numbers (e.g., many good people, two times) are traditionally categorized as adjectives, where modern grammars see them as determiners. This term has also been used for ordinals like first, tenth, and hundredth, which are undisputed adjectives.

==== Demonstrative adjectives ====
This type includes this, that, these, and those, which are seen by most modern grammars as determiners. It also includes the undisputed adjective such.

==== Possessive adjectives ====
This type includes my, your, our, their, etc. (e.g., my friend). These are categorized by most modern grammars as pronouns or determiners.

==== Interrogative adjectives ====
This type includes what, which and whose (e.g., what time). These are categorized by most modern grammars as pronouns or determiners. (What in exclamatives, e.g., what a lovely day! is an adjective, but is not interrogative.)

How in questions like How are you? is sometimes categorized as an interrogative adjective.

==== Distributive adjectives ====
This type includes words like any, each, and neither (e.g., any time). These are categorized by most modern grammars as determiners.

==== Indefinite adjectives ====
This type includes words like all, another, any, both, and each (e.g., another day). These are categorized by most modern grammars as determiners.

==== Pronominal adjectives ====
This type includes words that "qualify" a noun and must agree with it in number: all, these, some, no, etc.(e.g., these days). These are categorized by other grammars as determiners or pronouns.

==== Proper adjectives ====
This type includes words that are derived (or thought to be derived) from common nouns and are capitalized (e.g., an Italian vacation, a New York minute). Some of these are categorized by modern grammars as adjectives (e.g., Italian, Christian, Dubliner, Chinese, Thatcherite, etc.) and some as nouns (e.g., the Reagan administration, the Tokyo train system).

==== Compound adjectives ====
This type includes adjectives, or what were/are thought to be adjectives, composed of two or more words operating "as a single adjective" (e.g., straightlaced, New York (see above), long-term, etc.).

==== Relative adjectives ====
This type includes which and whose (e.g., the person whose book I bought) appearing in relative constructions. These are categorized by most modern grammars as pronouns or determiners.

== Morphology ==
=== Inflectional morphology ===
Many adjectives inflect for degree of comparison. For example, hot has the comparative form hotter and the superlative form hottest. Typically, short adjectives (including most single-syllable adjectives that are semantically gradable), adjectives originating in Old English, and short adjectives borrowed from French use the -er and -est suffixes. Adjectives with two syllables vary in whether they can mark degree of comparison through inflectional suffixes or must do so periphrastically with more and most. Some take either form (e.g., commoner, more common) while others take only one or the other (e.g., happier but usually not more happy). Longer adjectives derived from Greek or Latin and most adjectives of three or more syllables typically mark degree of comparison with more and most (e.g., more expensive but not expensiver).

=== Derivational morphology ===
==== Category maintaining ====
It is possible to form adjectives from other adjectives through the addition of prefixes (e.g., happy → unhappy; typical → atypical), and suffixes (e.g., young → youngish; botanic → botanical).

==== Category changing ====
===== Adjective forming =====
Adjectives may be formed by the addition of affixes to a base from another category of words. For example, the noun recreation combines with the suffix -al to form the adjective recreational.

- Prefixes of this type include a- + noun (blaze → ablaze) and non- + noun (stop → non-stop).
- Suffixes of this type include verb + -able (accept → acceptable), noun + -al (nation → national), noun + -esque (picture → picturesque), noun or verb + -less (home → homeless; tire → tireless), noun + -ate (passion → passionate), noun + -en (gold → golden), verb + -ive (act → active), and many others.

===== With an adjective as the lexical base =====
Through a process of derivational morphology, adjectives may form words of other categories. For example, the adjective happy combines with the suffix -ness to form the noun happiness.

- It is typical of English adjectives to combine with the -ly suffix to become adverbs (e.g., real → really; encouraging → encouragingly). (Note: -ly also forms adjectives from adjectives (e.g., goodly, kindly, likely, etc).)
- Noun-forming suffixes include -cy (private → privacy), -ness (happy → happiness), -dom (wise → wisdom), -hood (likely → likelihood), -ist (special → specialist), and -th (true → truth).
- Verb-forming affixes include -ify and -ize (e.g., real → realize; just → justify).
- Adjectives also form words through conversion, without any change in form (e.g., red (adj) → red (noun)).

==== Compounding ====
An adjective base can join with a base from another category to form a new word as in blackboard, noteworthy, childproof, fail-safe, uptight, etc.

== Adjectives vs other lexical categories ==
=== Adjectives vs nouns ===
Typically, adjectives and nouns in English can be distinguished by their morphological and syntactic features.

Prototypical adjectives can inflect for degree of comparison (e.g., happy and happier) but cannot inflect for number (e.g., happy but not happys). Conversely, prototypical nouns can inflect for number (e.g., mother and mothers) but not for degree of comparison (e.g., mother but not motherer or motherest).

English adjectives head phrases that typically function as pre-head modifiers of nouns or predicative complements (e.g., those nice folks seem quite capable) while English nouns head phrases that can function as subjects, or objects in verb phrases or preposition phrases (e.g., [Jess] told [my sister] [a story] about [cute animals]). Noun phrases also function, like adjective phrases, as predicative complements, though in a more limited range of contexts; for example, both be and feel allow the adjective phrase difficult as a predicative complement, but only be also allows the noun phrase a difficulty.

The prototypical pre-head modifiers of adjectives are adverb phrases (e.g., quite capable) while the prototypical pre-head modifiers of nouns are adjective phrases (e.g., those nice folks). Finally, English adjectives, unlike English nouns, cannot function as the heads of phrases containing determinatives or predeterminatives. The following table summarizes these characteristics:

	Adjectives	Nouns
Inflection	comparative (-er), superlative (-est)	plural (-s)
Typical function of the related phrases	pre-head modifier of noun, predicative complement	subject, object, predicative complement
Typical pre-head modifier	adverb phrase	adjective phrase
Occurrence with determinatives	do not head phrases containing determinatives	head phrases containing determinatives

The distinction between adjective and noun in English is not as clear in certain cases, such as with colour terms and noun-like words occurring in attributive position. In the case of colour terms, the category can often be identified without controversy. For instance, colour terms used as subjects (e.g., orange is the colour of my love) or predicative complements (e.g., my favourite colour is orange) are typical nouns while colour terms occurring attributively (e.g., the orange flower) are typical adjectives. Similarly, colour terms marked as plural (e.g., the reds in the painting) are nouns while those marked as comparative (e.g., redder) or superlative (e.g., reddest) are adjectives. However, the categorization of colour terms is less clear in cases like The foliage emerged, becoming deep green as the summer unfolds. Here, the modifier of the colour term is an adjective (deep) rather than an adverb (deeply), which suggests that green is a noun. But the phrase occurs as the predicative complement of become and could, in principle, be modified by an adverb like very or appear in comparative form, which are typical characteristics of adjectives. Bas Aarts notes that this apparent dual categorization can be avoided by treating terms like deep orange as adjective-adjective compounds.

Almost any noun may appear in attributive position (e.g., a geography student), but in doing so they have traditionally said to be "functioning as an adjective". Such words are like adjectives in that they function as pre-head modifiers of nouns and resist pluralization in this position (*a geographies student). However, they are more like nouns in that they can be modified by adjective phrases, not adverb phrases (e.g., a cultural geography student, not *a culturally geography student), are not gradable, and cannot occur alone as predicative complements (*the student seems geography). Despite sharing features of both adjectives and nouns, modern dictionaries and grammars typically assign these words to the category of noun, though some describe them as a subset of noun called "adjectival nouns."

=== Adjectives vs verbs ===
Many adjectives derive from present participles (e.g., interesting, willing, & amazing) or past participles (e.g., tired, involved, & concerned). These can often be distinguished from verbs by their ability to be modified by very (e.g., very tired but not *very based on it) or appear after become as predicative complements. Adjectives almost never take objects, so a case like They were entertaining guests must be a verb.

=== Adjectives vs prepositions ===
Most prepositions are not gradable, so this can often distinguish them from adjectives, which typically are. As a result, adjectives can typically be modified by adverbs very, so, and too, while prepositions typically cannot. Conversely, prepositions can typically be modified by right (e.g., right up the tree), while adjectives cannot. Finally, preposition phrases readily function as non-predicative adjuncts in clause structure (e.g., after dinner, there was dancing) while AdjPs are typically ungrammatical without a predicand (e.g., *Enjoyable, there was dancing).

== Semantics ==
Apart from the general semantic properties of adjectives (denoting properties such as size, colour, mood, quality, age, etc.), English adjectives have various semantic properties that are not as general.

=== Quantification and number ===
An adjective can express quantification over the events described by the verb. For example, the adjective occasional in She also has an occasional drink (i.e., “She drinks occasionally.”) quantifies over her drinking rather than describing the drink.

Although English adjectives do not participate in the system of number the way determiners, nouns, and pronouns do, English adjectives may still express number semantically. For example, adjectives like several, various, and multiple are semantically plural, while those like single, lone, and unitary have singular semantics.

=== Definiteness and specificity ===
In English, the definiteness of a noun phrase is usually marked on the determiner, not on adjectives. But certain adjectives, in particular superlatives, are mostly incompatible with an indefinite interpretation of the NP. Cases like *they were best students seem ungrammatical, though exceptions such as they were best friends exist. In cases such as a best-case scenario, best-case is a nominal, not a full NP.

Non-superlatives can also work in this way. The adjectives wrong and right are often incompatible with an indefinite NP (e.g., *they found a right person; here suitable would be better) but are possible in other cases (e.g., there isn't a right answer).

Unlike some languages, English does not mark the specificity of NPs grammatically. But NPs with adjective modifiers such as specific or certain are generally interpreted specifically, while those with adjective modifiers such as arbitrary are generally interpreted non-specifically.

=== Grammar–semantics ===
==== Pre-head vs post-head modification ====
A noun phrase with an adjective phrase functioning as a pre-head modifier may have a different interpretation from one with the same modifier appearing after the head noun. For example, the visible stars can mean either those stars that are visible at a particular time or those that are generally visible. In contrast, the stars visible does not have the "generally visible" interpretation.

==== Compounds vs modifiers ====
The semantic contribution of adjectives as modifiers in a noun phrase is typically quite different from the semantic contribution of the same adjective as a base in a compound word. A green house, for instance, is a house that is green in colour, but a greenhouse is neither green in colour nor a house. Similarly, a bigmouth is not a mouth that is big, nor is a highway a way that is high or software ware that is soft. The phonology of these pairs also differs. With the adjective as a modifier in a noun phrase, the adjective and the noun typically receive equal stress (a black bird), but in a compound, the adjective typically takes primary word stress (a blackbird).

Only a small set of English adjectives function in this way:

- The colour words black, blue, brown, green, grey, red, and white
- Grand in words of family relationships
- A set of monosyllabic gradable adjectives such as: broad, dry, free, hard, hot, mad, small, sweet, etc.
- A small set of non-gradable monosyllabic adjectives: blind, dumb, first, quick (= 'alive'), square, whole
- A very small number of disyllabic adjectives: bitter, narrow and possibly silly
