= Geoffrey Leech =

British linguist (1936–2014)

- Born: 16 January 1936; Gloucester, Gloucestershire, England
- Died: 19 August 2014 (aged 78); Lancaster, Lancashire, England

Geoffrey Neil Leech FBA (16 January 1936 – 19 August 2014) was a specialist in English language and linguistics. He was the author, co-author, or editor of more than 30 books and more than 120 published papers. His main academic interests were English grammar, corpus linguistics, stylistics, pragmatics, and semantics.

== Life and career ==
Leech was born in Gloucester, England on 16 January 1936. He was educated at Tewkesbury Grammar School, Gloucestershire, and at University College London (UCL), where he was awarded a BA (1959) and PhD (1968). He began his teaching career at UCL, where he was influenced by Randolph Quirk and Michael Halliday as senior colleagues. He spent 1964-5 as a Harkness Fellow at the Massachusetts Institute of Technology, Cambridge MA. In 1969 Leech moved to Lancaster University, UK, where he was Professor of English Linguistics from 1974 to 2001. In 2002 he became Emeritus Professor in the Department of Linguistics and English Language, Lancaster University. He was a Fellow of the British Academy, an Honorary Fellow of UCL and of Lancaster University, a Member of the Academia Europaea and the Norwegian Academy of Science and Letters, and an honorary doctor of three universities, most recently of Charles University, Prague (2012). He died in Lancaster, England on 19 August 2014.

== Research and publication ==
Leech's most important research contributions are the following:

=== English grammar ===
Leech contributed to three team projects resulting in large-scale descriptive reference grammars of English, all published as lengthy single-volume works: A Grammar of Contemporary English (with Randolph Quirk, Sidney Greenbaum and Jan Svartvik, 1972); A Comprehensive Grammar of the English Language (with Randolph Quirk, Sidney Greenbaum and Jan Svartvik, 1985); and the Longman Grammar of Spoken and Written English (LGSWE) (with Douglas Biber, Stig Johansson, Susan Conrad and Edward Finegan, 1999). These grammars have been broadly regarded as providing an authoritative "standard" account of English grammar, although the rather traditional framework employed has also been criticised — e.g. by Huddleston and Pullum (2002) in their Cambridge Grammar of the English Language.

=== Corpus linguistics ===
Inspired by the corpus-building work of Randolph Quirk at UCL, soon after his arrival at Lancaster, Leech pioneered computer corpus development. He initiated the first electronic corpus of British English, completed in 1978 as the [Lancaster-Oslo-Bergen Corpus|Lancaster-Oslo/Bergen] (LOB) Corpus. Later, in the 1990s, he took a leading role in the compilation of the British National Corpus (BNC). The Lancaster research group that he co-founded (UCREL) also developed programs for the annotation of corpora: especially corpus taggers and parsers. The term treebank, now generally applied to a parsed corpus, was coined by Leech in the 1980s. The LGSWE grammar (1999) was systematically based on corpus analysis. Leech's more recent corpus research has centred on grammatical change in recent and contemporary English.

=== Stylistics ===
Leech has written extensively on the stylistics of literary texts. The two stylistic works for which he is best known are A Linguistic Guide to English Poetry (1969) and Style in Fiction (1981; 2nd edn. 2007), co-authored with Mick Short. The latter book won the PALA25 Silver Jubilee Prize for "the most influential book in stylistics" since 1980. The approach Leech has taken to literary style relies heavily on the concept of foregrounding, a term derived from P. L. Garvin's translation of the Czech term aktualisace, referring to the psychological prominence (against the background of ordinary language) of artistic effects in literature. In Leech's account, foregrounding in poetry is based on deviation from linguistic norms, which may take the form of unexpected irregularity (as in Dylan Thomas's A grief ago) as well as unexpected regularity (or parallelism – as in I kissed thee ere I killed thee from Othello). Further, Leech has distinguished three levels of deviation:

- primary deviation: deviation against the background of general linguistic norms;
- secondary deviation: deviation against the norms of conventional poetic regularity, as in metrical variation and run-on lines in verse;
- tertiary deviation: deviation against norms established within a literary text.

=== Semantics ===
Leech's interest in semantics was strong in the period up to 1980, when it gave way to his interest in pragmatics. His PhD thesis at London University was on the semantics of place, time and modality in English, and was subsequently published under the title Towards a Semantic Description of English (1969). At a more popular level, he published Semantics (1974, 1981), in which the seven types of meaning discussed in Chapter 2 have been widely cited:

- 1. Conceptual (or logical) meaning - the meaning of an utterance as defined by linguistic analysis of morphology, phonology, syntax and semantics. (others call this designative, denotative, descriptive, or cognitive meaning)
  - Constituent structure: Conceptual meaning is composed of smaller units.
  - Contrastive features: Any conceptual meaning and the units that compose it are defined by what something is, as opposed to what it is not.
- 2. Connotative meaning - the parts that the communication is referring to, which are outside the communication itself.
- 3. Social meaning - the meaning derived from the situation in which the communication was created.
- 4. Affective meaning - the personal meaning given by the person receiving or analyzing the communication as it affects them.
- 5. Reflected meaning - the meaning obtained when a communication's original meaning is overshadowed by taboo.
- 6. Collocative meaning - the meaning created by idioms, figure of speech, or patterns of common usage with some words but not others, which change a words original conceptual meaning.
- 7. Thematic (associative) meaning - the meaning by rhetoric choices such as emphasis through location at the beginning or end of a communication, by the choice of the active or passive tense, and the effect of the choice of other nearby words.

These are sometimes compared to Roman Jakobson's six communication functions: Connative (requesting an action or response), emotive (communication of emotions), referential (communicating facts and opinions), Phatic (communication handshakes, acknowledgment, politeness etc.), poetic function, and meta-linguistic functions (self referring to the communication itself).

=== Pragmatics ===
In the 1970s and 1980s Leech took a part in the development of pragmatics as a newly emerging subdiscipline of linguistics deeply influenced by the ordinary-language philosophers J. L. Austin, J. R. Searle and H. P. Grice. In his main book on the subject, Principles of Pragmatics (1983), he argued for a general account of pragmatics based on regulative principles following the model of Grice's (1975) Cooperative principle (CP), with its constitutive maxims of Quantity, Quality, Relation and Manner. The part of the book that has had most influence is that dealing with the Principle of Politeness, seen as a principle having constituent maxims like Grice's CP. The politeness maxims Leech distinguished are: the Tact Maxim, Generosity Maxim, Approbation Maxim, Modesty Maxim, Agreement Maxim and Sympathy Maxim. This Gricean treatment of politeness has been much criticised: for example, it has been criticised for being "expansionist" (adding new maxims to the Gricean model) rather than "reductionist" (reducing Grice's four maxims to a smaller number, as in Relevance theory, where the Maxim of Relation, or principle of relevance, is the only one that survives). Leech is also criticised for allowing the addition of new maxims to be unconstrained (in defiance of Occam's Razor), and for his postulation of an "absolute politeness" which does not vary according to situation, whereas most politeness theorists maintain that politeness cannot be identified out of context. In his article "Politeness: Is there an East-West divide?" (2007), Leech addresses these criticisms and presents a revision of his politeness model.

== Selected publications ==
- G. N. Leech (1966), English in Advertising, London: Longman, pp.xiv + 210
- G. N. Leech (1969), A Linguistic Guide to English Poetry, London: Longman, pp.xiv + 240
- G. N. Leech (1971), Meaning and the English Verb, London: Longman, pp.xiv + 132 (2nd and 3rd editions: 1987, 2004)
- R. Quirk, S. Greenbaum, G. Leech and J. Svartvik (1972), A Grammar of Contemporary English, London: Longman, pp.xii + 1120
- G. Leech (1974), Semantics, London: Penguin, pp.xii + 386 (2nd edition, entitled Semantics: the Study of Meaning, 1981)
- G. Leech and J. Svartvik (1975), A Communicative Grammar of English, London: Longman, pp. 324 (2nd and 3rd editions: 1994, 2002)
- G. N. Leech and M. H. Short (1981), Style in Fiction: A Linguistic Introduction to English Fictional Prose, London: Longman, pp. xiv + 402 (2nd edition, 2007)
- G. Leech, M. Deuchar, R. Hoogenraad (1982), English Grammar for Today, London: Macmillan
- G. Leech, (1983), Principles of Pragmatics, London: Longman, pp.xiv + 250
- R. Quirk, S. Greenbaum, G. Leech and J. Svartvik (1985), A Comprehensive Grammar of the English Language, London: Longman pp. xii + 1779
- R. Garside, G. Leech and G. Sampson (eds.) (1987), The Computational Analysis of English: A Corpus-based Approach, London: Longman, pp. viii + 196
- G. Leech, G. Myers and J. Thomas (eds.) (1995), Spoken English on Computer: Transcription, Mark-up and Application. London: Longman, pp.xii + 260
- R. Garside, G. Leech and A.McEnery (eds.) (1997), Corpus Annotation: Linguistic Information from Computer Text Corpora, London: Longman, pp.x + 281
- D. Biber, S. Johansson, G. Leech, S. Conrad and E. Finegan (1999), Longman Grammar of Spoken and Written English, London: Longman, pp.xxviii+1204
- D. Biber, S. Conrad and G. Leech (2002), Longman Student Grammar of Spoken and Written English. London: Longman, pp.viii+487
- J. Svartvik and G. Leech (2006) English – One Tongue, Many Voices. Basingstoke: Palgrave Macmillan, pp. xvi+287.
- G. Leech (2008) Language in Literature: Style and Foregrounding. Harlow, England: Pearson Longman, pp. xii+222.
- G. Leech, M. Hundt, C. Mair and N. Smith (2009) Change in Contemporary English: A Grammatical Study. Cambridge: Cambridge University Press, pp. xxx+341.
- G. Leech (2014), The Pragmatics of Politeness, Oxford University Press. pp. 343.
