= A Comprehensive Grammar of the English Language =

1985 compendium on the English language

- Author: Randolph Quirk, Sidney Greenbaum, Geoffrey Leech, & Jan Svartvik
- Subject: Comprehensive descriptive grammar of the English language
- Publisher: Longman
- Publication date: 1985
- Media type: Print (Hardcover)
- Pages: 1779
- ISBN: 9780582517349

A Comprehensive Grammar of the English Language is a descriptive grammar of English written by Randolph Quirk, Sidney Greenbaum, Geoffrey Leech, and Jan Svartvik. It was first published by Longman in 1985.

In 1991, it was called "The greatest of contemporary grammars, because it is the most thorough and detailed we have," and "It is a grammar that transcends national boundaries."

The book relies on elicitation experiments as well as three corpora: a corpus from the Survey of English Usage, the Lancaster-Oslo-Bergen Corpus (UK English), and the Brown Corpus (US English).

== Reviews ==
In 1988, Rodney Huddleston published a very critical review. He wrote:

[T]here are some respects in which it is seriously flawed and disappointing. A number of quite basic categories and concepts do not seem to have been thought through with sufficient care; this results in a remarkable amount of unclarity and inconsistency in the analysis, and in the organization of the grammar.

- Aarts, F. G. A. M. (April 1988). "A Comprehensive Grammar of the English Language: The great tradition continued". English Studies. 69 (2): 163–173. doi:10.1080/00138388808598565.

== See also ==
- Longman Grammar of Spoken and Written English
- Cambridge Grammar of the English Language
