= Randolph Quirk =

British linguist (1920–2017)

The Right Honourable The Lord Quirk of Bloomsbury CBE FBA
- Lord Quirk in 2016

Member of the House of Lords
- Lord Temporal
- Life peerage 12 July 1994 – 20 December 2017

Vice-Chancellor of University of London
- In office 1981–1985
- Preceded by: Lord Annan
- Succeeded by: Lord Flowers

Personal details
- Born: Charles Randolph Quirk; 12 July 1920 Isle of Man
- Died: 20 December 2017 (aged 97)
- Education: St Ninian's High School, Douglas; University College London
- Occupation: Linguist

Military service
- Allegiance: United Kingdom
- Branch/service: Royal Air Force
- Years of service: 1940–1945
- Rank: Squadron leader
- Unit: Bomber Command

Charles Randolph Quirk, Baron Quirk (12 July 1920 – 20 December 2017) was a British linguist and politician. He was the Quain Professor of English language and literature at University College London from 1968 to 1981. He sat as a crossbencher in the House of Lords.

== Life and career ==
Quirk was born at his family's farm, Lambfell, near Kirk Michael on the Isle of Man, where his family farmed, the son of Thomas and Amy Randolph Quirk. He attended Douglas High School for Boys on the island and then went to University College London (UCL) to read English (the department relocated to Aberystwyth due to the war) under A.H. Smith. His studies began in 1939 but were interrupted in 1940 by five years of service in Bomber Command of the RAF, where he rose to the rank of squadron leader.

Quirk became so deeply interested in explosives that he started an external degree in chemistry, but his English undergraduate studies were completed from 1945 to 1947 (with the department back in Bloomsbury) and he was then invited to take up a research fellowship in Cambridge; however he took up a counter-offer of a junior lectureship at UCL, which he held until 1952. In this period he completed his MA on phonology and his PhD thesis on syntax, and in 1951 became a post-doctoral Commonwealth Fund fellow at Yale University and Michigan State University. Shortly after his return from the US in 1952, he moved to the University of Durham, becoming reader there in 1954, and professor in 1958. He returned to UCL as professor in 1960 and in 1968 succeeded Smith as Quain Professor, a post he held until 1981.

Quirk lectured and gave seminars at UCL in Old English (Anglo-Saxon) and the History of the English Language. These two disciplines were part of a ten-discipline set of final examinations in the undergraduate syllabus. At that time Old and Middle English, along with History of the English Language, were all compulsory subjects in that course. He also worked closely with A. C. Gimson and J. D. O'Connor of the Phonetics Department, sometimes sitting in as an examiner for Phonetics oral examinations.

In 1985, he was awarded the honorary degree of Doctor of Letters by the University of Bath.

== Survey of English Usage ==
In 1959, Quirk founded the Survey of English Usage, working with Valerie Adams, Derek Davy and David Crystal; they sampled written and spoken British English produced between 1955 and 1985. The corpus comprises 200 texts, each of 5,000 words. The spoken texts include dialogue and monologue, and the written texts material intended for both reading and reading aloud.

The project was to be the foundation of A Comprehensive Grammar of the English Language, a widely used reference grammar and the first of English in real use rather than structured by rules derived from Greek and Latin models. Quirk and his collaborators proposed a descriptive rather than prescriptive grammar, showing readers that different groups of English speakers choose different usages, and argued that what is correct is what communicates effectively. The work was groundbreaking, though one proposed flaw is that the examples used were written by the scholars, not collected from texts, as preferred by one of the tutors at the Summer School, Edward Black.

== Summer School of English ==
One of Quirk's favourite enterprises was the London University Summer School of English, where the above-mentioned colleagues and other budding scholars and friends of his came to teach for a month. It was considered the most eminent body of English teachers anywhere in the world. The resident students were foreign academics, teachers and students. He threw himself into the social life with gusto and enjoyed singing Victorian ballads in a Cockney accent over a "couple of pints". When the School moved away from Queen Elizabeth College to New Cross, numbers fell rapidly. The next and last successful director was the phonetician J. D. O'Connor.

== Awards ==
Quirk was appointed a Commander of the Order of the British Empire (CBE) in the 1976 New Year Honours, and was knighted in 1985. He had openly been a Labour supporter all his life, although he sat in the House of Lords as a cross-bench peer. He was President of the British Academy from 1985 to 1989 and became a life peer as Baron Quirk, of Bloomsbury in the London Borough of Camden on 12 July 1994. He sat on the boards of Pearson Education and the Linguaphone Institute.

== Personal life ==
Until his death, in 2017, he resided in Germany and England. His second wife was the German linguist Gabriele Stein. She died on 6 March 2020.

== Publications ==
=== Books ===
- Quirk, Randolph; Wrenn, Charles Leslie (1957). An Old English Grammar. Taylor & Francis, p. 166. ISBN 0-416-77240-4.
- Quirk, Randolph; Greenbaum, Sidney; Leech, Geoffrey; Svartvik, Jan (1985). A comprehensive grammar of the English language. Harlow: Longman, p. 1779. ISBN 0-582-51734-6.
- Quirk, Randolph (1986). Words at work: lectures on textual structure. NUS Press, p. 137. ISBN 9971-69-102-7.
- Greenbaum, Sidney; Quirk, Randolph (1990). A Student's Grammar of the English Language. Addison Wesley Publishing Company, p. 496. ISBN 0-582-05971-2.

=== Forewords ===
- Jan Marsh, Spoken, Broken and Bloody English: The Story of George Bernard Shaw, Linguaphone and Eliza Doolittle, London: Linguaphone Institute, 2002.

Academic offices
Preceded by Lord Annan	Vice-Chancellor of University of London; 1981–1985	Succeeded by Lord Flowers
