= English interrogative words =

English words that indicate a question is being asked, as a grammatical category

In English, the interrogative words (sometimes known as "wh words") may be divided into those associated with asking open-ended questions (how, what, when, where, which, who, whom, whose, and why, all of which also have -ever forms, e.g., whatever) and those associated with asking closed-ended questions (whether and if). (Note: This is the if in I wonder if it will work, not the conditional if in If it works, that's great.)

The main role of these words is to mark a clause as interrogative. For example, How did you do it? is marked as an interrogative clause by the presence of how, and in I wonder whether it's true, whether marks the subordinate clause whether it's true as interrogative.

== Extended membership ==
Along with the words listed above, the members include some older or archaic words, including whence, whither, and other compound prepositions such as whereby, wherein, formed from one of the central interrogative words plus a preposition.

== Semantics ==
Semantically speaking, when used in a main clause, the interrogative words do not refer but rather question. For example, who in Who likes sewage? does not pick out a specific individual in the world, but rather asks about the identity of such an individual, should they exist. In a subordinate clause, though, this may be different. For example, how in I know how to do it, denotes a particular way of doing it rather than asking about a way.

=== Individual words ===
- What is used to ask about or denote the identity of almost anything including situations (What's happening), objects (What is that thing?), and places (What city?). It cannot typically be used for persons, especially on its own. For example, What is behind that door? cannot be used to ask about a person unless it is not clear that it is a person. However, it may be used for a person's role (What is he?), and it can be combined with a noun denoting a person (What person would do that? or What child doesn't love their parents?).
- Who (with its other forms whom and whose) is limited to asking about the identity of persons or denoting them.
- Which is used to ask about or denote one or more members from a set.
- Where is used to ask about or denote locations.
- When is used to ask about or denote times.
- How is used to ask about or denote manner, dispositions, and evaluations.
- Why is used to ask about or denote reasons, causes, and explanations.
- Whence and whither (both distinctly archaic) refer to a place (broadly conceived) with respectively a "from" and a "to" meaning.

All of the words above may be used to ask for any number of answers. For example, Who comes on Thursday? can be asked whether the expected response is singular or plural. (For agreement purposes, though, interrogative words are singular.)

In contrast, whether and if, like other subordinators, have no semantic value, and simply mark the clause as interrogative.

== Lexical categories and syntactic functions ==
Although the main role of interrogative words is to mark a clause as interrogative, each also has a syntactic function when used in a phrase with one or more dependents, just as any word would. For example, in What time works for you?, what functions as a determiner within the noun phrase (and interrogative phrase) what time; while in Who arrived?, who (itself a noun phrase and interrogative phrase, although it lacks dependents) functions as the subject.

Different words have different functions depending on their lexical category. For example, while a pronoun like who may typically function as a subject, a preposition like when rarely does so. Moreover, the form of the word may constrain its function. Whose (the genitive form of who), for instance, can function as a determiner, while who and whom cannot.

=== Individual words ===
- Who (together with its forms whom and whose) is a pronoun.
- What is a pronoun or determiner. (Note: Aarts uses the term determinative for the word category that we call "determiner".)
- Which is a pronoun or determiner.
- Where is an intransitive preposition.
- When is an intransitive preposition.
- How is usually an adverb (e.g., How rusty is it?) but sometimes an adjective (e.g., How was the movie?).
- Why is an adverb.
- Whether and if are subordinators.

== Syntax ==
Interrogative words typically appear initially in interrogative clauses. It is possible, however, for adjuncts to be moved in front (Tomorrow where are you going?) and interrogative words may even appear elsewhere, as in You did what? or And you put this where? When there are two or more interrogative phrases in a single clause, only one may move to the front of the clause, as in Who said to do what? or What did who say to do? (and neither *Who what said to do? nor *What who said to do?).

Interrogative words may also be used on their own. What? for example, is often used to signal that the speaker didn't hear or understand what was said.

== Etymology ==
Ultimately, the English interrogative words (those beginning with wh in addition to the word how), derive from the Proto-Indo-European root k^{w}o- or k^{w}i, the former of which was reflected in Proto-Germanic as χ^{w}a- or kh^{w}a-, due to Grimm's law.

These underwent further sound changes and spelling changes, notably wh-cluster reductions, resulting in the initial sound being either /w/ (in most dialects) or /h/ (how, who) and the initial spelling being either wh or h (how). This was the result of two sound changes – /hw/ > /h/ before /uː/ (how, who) and /hw/ > /w/ otherwise – and the spelling change from hw to wh in Middle English. The unusual pronunciation versus spelling of who is because the vowel was formerly /aː/, and thus it did not undergo the sound change in Old English, but in Middle English (following spelling change) the vowel changed to /uː/ and it followed the same sound change as how before it, but with the Middle English spelling unchanged.

In how (Old English hū, from Proto-Germanic χ^{w}ō), the w merged into the lave of the word, as it did in Old Frisian hū, hō (Dutch hoe "how"), but it can still be seen in Old Saxon hwō, Old High German hwuo (German wie "how"). In English, the gradual change of voiceless stops into voiceless fricatives (phase 1 of Grimm's law) during the development of Germanic languages is responsible for "wh-" of interrogatives. Although some varieties of American English and various Scottish dialects still preserve the original sound (i.e. [ʍ] rather than [w]), most have only the [w].

The words who, whom, whose, what and why, can all be considered to come from a single Old English word hwā, reflecting its masculine and feminine nominative (hwā), dative (hwām), genitive (hwæs), neuter nominative and accusative (hwæt), and instrumental (masculine and neuter singular) (hwȳ, later hwī) respectively. Other interrogative words, such as which, how, where, whence, or whither, derive either from compounds (which coming from a compound of hwā [what, who] and līc [like]), or other words from the same root (how deriving from hū).

== Interrogative vs relative words ==
There is significant overlap between the English interrogative words and the English relative words, but the relative words that and while are not interrogative words, (Note: Thus the common terms "wh word" or "wh form" may be misleading.) and, in Standard English, what and how are mostly excluded from the relative words. Most or all of the archaic interrogative words are also relative words.

Although as an interrogative word, whose is limited to denoting persons, relative whose may denote non-persons, as in a book whose cover is missing.

== Interrogative versus echo-question words ==
An inaudible, incomprehensible, or implausible word can be questioned with either of the echo-question words, what or who:

- We'll have to extrapolate for the next three years. / We'll have to what for the next three years?
- Previous attachés included Robin Vane-Tempest-Stewart. / Robin vain who?

Echo-question words are not interrogative words. In the first example, what is a verb; (Note: In other contexts, echo-question what can belong to other categories.) in the second, who is not phrase-initial. Neither is possible for interrogative what or who.

== Interrogative versus exclamative words ==
There are only two English exclamative words, what and how.

- What a lovely day!
- How much snow has fallen!
- How nice it is to finally meet you!

They are not interrogative words. They appear in exclamative phrases on their own or in exclamative clauses, and, as with interrogatives, participate in unbounded dependency constructions.
