= English adverbs =

Words

English adverbs are words such as so, just, how, well, also, very, even, only, really, and why that head adverb phrases, and whose most typical members function as modifiers in verb phrases and clauses, along with adjective and adverb phrases. The category is highly heterogeneous, but a large number of the very typical members are derived from adjectives + the suffix -ly (e.g., actually, probably, especially, & finally) and modify any word, phrase or clause other than a noun. Adverbs form an open lexical category in English. They do not typically license or function as complements in other phrases. Semantically, they are again highly various, denoting manner, degree, duration, frequency, domain, modality, and much more.

== History of the concept in English ==
One of the first records we have of the word adverb used in English is from c1425.

as twyes 4 is 8. now here ben þe 2 nombers, of þe quych too nowmbres on is betokened be an aduerbe, þe quych is þe worde twyes
as twice four is eight. Now here are the two numbers, of the which two numbers one is betokened by an adverb, the which is the word twice
"as in twice 4 is 8. Now, here there are the two numbers, the first of which (i.e., 2) is represented by the adverb 'twice'."

William Bullokar wrote the earliest grammar of English, published in 1586. It includes a chapter on adverbs. His definition follows:

An adverb is a part of speech joined with a verb or participle to declare their signification more expressly by such adverb: as, come hither if they wilt go forth, sometimes with an adjective: as, thus broad: & sometimes joined with another adverb: as, how soon, as speedily, yet both those depending upon some verb or participle always of an acting, passing, or being signification. which you that the easier know to be an adverb, by asking the question, what, upon it, whereunto a verb, participle or adjective answers single or in sentence. But if a substantive answers to the question, be sure that it is a preposition, for an adverb governs not any case nor is governed of any word. (p. 365; orthography has been modernized)

The idea that adverbs modify only verbs is traditional to grammars of Greek and Latin, and the idea is common in English grammar up to at least 1775. When it became broadly accepted that adverbs modified more than verbs, grammarians struggled to delimit the extent of their range.

In 1801, Mercy observes that “the adverb may be known by interrogating with the adverb how” (1801: 13)

In 1784, John Hunter made the argument that many words that had sometimes been categorized as adverbs were, in fact, prepositions.

ALTHOUGH all these uses of the word TO are really one and the same, differing in nothing but this, that the object governed by it is, in some of them, expressed and, in others, not expressed; yet the grammarians have considered them as different, and have classed TO, in the one case, with the Prepositions, and, in the other, with the Conjunctions, or with the Adverbs.

This idea was taken up by later grammarians, including Jespersen (1924) and The Cambridge grammar of the English language (2002). On the other hand, dictionaries and ESL grammars have not adopted these ideas. For example, Merriam-Webster's Dictionary has before as an adverb and as a preposition.

Although most modern linguists accept the idea that lexical categories, such as adverb, cannot be defined semantically, Langacker argues that they can. Aarts summarizes this: "Verbs designate processes, whereas adjectives and adverbs are said to designate atemporal relations"

== Adverb vs other lexical categories ==
=== Adverb vs adjective ===
In the general case, adverbs do not function as attributive modifiers in a noun phrase, where adjectives typically do. Conversely, adjectives do not function as modifiers in phrases apart from NPs. So you have the happy child, but not *the happily child and I will happily take it, but not *I will happy take it. (Note: This article uses asterisks to indicate ungrammatical examples.)

There are cases, though, in which an adverb may be a non-attributive modifier in a noun phrase (NP), as in the situation recently in Spain. Also, adverbs may modify whole NPs as with even my neighbour. Some adverbs also share pronunciation and spelling with adjectives (e.g., very), which makes such tests inconclusive; you can't rule out the possibility that a word is an adverb simply because a word spelled that way can be a modifier in an NP. Moreover, not all adjectives can be attributive.

Morphologically, many adverbs are formed by adding -ly to an adjective (e.g., easy → easily). It's also the case, though, that some adjectives end in -ly (e.g., friendly). There are also at least a few linguists who believe that -ly adverbs are simply an inflectional form of adjectives.

There are two interrogative words how, an adverb and an adjective. The adjective is used only in question such as how was it, where the expected response is an adjective phrase such as good or very interesting.

=== Adverb vs intransitive preposition ===
(see also List of English prepositions § Intransitive prepositions)

Jespersen and others argue that many words traditionally taken to be adverbs are actually prepositions (see § History of the concept in English). Many linguists agree with Jespersen, but most dictionaries and ESL grammars have not adopted these ideas. For example, Merriam-Webster's Dictionary has before as an adverb, preposition, and conjunction.

If the distinction is accepted, then it becomes important to distinguish between the two groups. A useful starting point is to recognize that many adverbs end in -ly, which clearly distinguishes them from prepositions. Another clarifying difference is that prepositional phrases (PPs) commonly function as complements in a be verb phrase (VP) (e.g., the key's in the car), while adverbs cannot normally do so (e.g., *the key's internally). Another distinguishing features is that PPs may have right or just as a modifier. In Standard English, adverb phrases do not accept such modification (e.g., it ran right up the tree [PP]; *it ran right vertically [AdvP].)

=== Adverb vs coordinators ===
"A number of conjunct adverbs, such as so and yet, resemble coordinators (coordinating conjunctions) both in being connectives and in having certain syntactic features." One difference is that many adverbs are quite flexible in the location, while coordinators are not. Consider these examples, where but must appear between the clauses, but however can appear in any one of three different locations.

1. That one's good, but this one's not. [coordinator]
2. That one's good. (however), this one (however) is not (however).

The difference can also be seen in punctuation. In (2), unlike (1), a comma is not possible after good.

== The syntax of adverbs and adverb phrases ==
=== Internal structure ===
AdvPs are usually quite simple in their internal structures. The following syntax tree shows an AdvP with the adverb phrase more as modifier and the head adverb quickly.

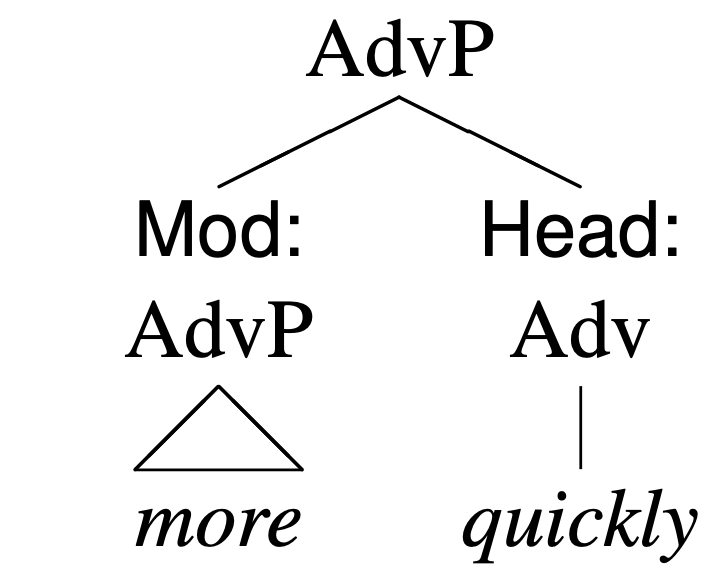

Adverb phrases rarely license complements as dependents, but it is possible, as in independently of the others. "Only adverbs with the -ly suffix license direct complements."

=== Functions ===
Adverb phrases function as modifier in a clause or almost any kind of phrase, with the notable exception that they do not function as attributive modifier in noun phrases. Individual adverbs, however, are usually not that flexible. For example, the adverbs straight and right characteristically function as modifier in PPs but not in AdvP (e.g., right up the tree but not *right vertically). Similarly, very characteristically functions as modifier in AdjPs and AdvP but not in VPs (e.g., very happy & very happily, but not *very enjoyed). A small number of adverbs modify whole NPs. These include even, only, and alone.

AdvPs can function as complements to verbs such as treat as in they treated me kindly.

=== Interrogatives ===
There are two interrogative adverbs: how and why. In independent open interrogative clauses, why and how are typically fronted.

== Semantics ==
A comprehensive grammar of the English language gives the following (non-exhaustive) list of semantic roles for "adverbials": space, time, process, respect, contingency, modality, and degree. The Cambridge grammar of the English language gives the following:

=== Negation ===
The words not and never are adverbs that participate in negation (see English clause syntax § Negation).

=== Scope ===
The scope of an adverb is the part of an utterance with which it combines in meaning. Adverb phrase placement affects the scope. Consider the difference in meaning between the following:

- Quite likely, the award will be won by [the most creative person here].
- The award will be won by [quite likely the most creative person here].

In the first example, the AdvP has scope over the whole clause, while in the second it has scope over only the NP in the by phrase.

== Morphology ==
=== Word formation ===
Most adverbs are formed by adding -ly to an adjective (see above), but a few other adverb forming suffixes are productive. One example is -wise, which combines with a noun to form adverbs such as clockwise, and edgewise. Many adverbs are simple bases. These include not, well, fast, right, and very.

=== Comparative and superlative ===
Only a few adverbs inflect for grade, that is have comparative and superlative forms. These are most common in one or two syllable adverbs derived from adjectives. Some examples are early, earlier, earliest; quickly, quicklier, quickliest, and well, better, best.
