= Title case =

Capitalization style

Title case or headline case is a style of capitalization used for rendering the titles of published works or works of art in English. When using title case, all words are capitalized, except for minor words (typically articles, short prepositions, and some conjunctions) that are not the first or last word of the title. There are different rules for which words are major, and hence capitalized. As an example, a headline might be written: "The Quick Brown Fox Jumps over the Lazy Dog".

== Rules ==
Rules of title case are standardized only at the level of house styles and individual style guides, not universally. Most English style guides agree that the first and last words should always be capitalized, whereas articles, short prepositions, and some conjunctions should not be. Other rules about the capitalization vary.

In text processing, title case usually involves the capitalization of all words irrespective of their part of speech. This simplified variant of title case is also known as "start case" or "initial caps".

=== AMA Manual of Style ===
According to the 11th edition of the AMA Manual of Style of the American Medical Association (AMA), the following title capitalization rules should be applied:

- Capitalize the first and the last word of titles and subtitles.
- Capitalize nouns, pronouns, adjectives, verbs (including phrasal verbs such as "play with"), adverbs, and subordinate conjunctions (major words).
- Lowercase articles (a, an, the), coordinating conjunctions, and prepositions of three letters or fewer.
- Lowercase "to" in infinitives.
- Lowercase the second word in a hyphenated compound when it is a prefix or suffix (e.g., "Anti-itch", "World-wide") or part of a single word.
- Capitalize the second word in a hyphenated compound if both words are equal and not suffixes or prefixes (e.g., "Cost-Benefit")
- Capitalize the first non-Greek letter after a lowercase Greek letter (e.g., "ω-Bromohexanoic")
- Lowercase the first non-Greek letter after a capital Greek letter (e.g., "Δ-9-tetrahydrocannabinol")
- Capitalize the genus but not the species epithet (e.g., "Homo sapiens").

=== APA style ===
According to the 7th edition of the Publication Manual of the American Psychological Association, the following title capitalization rules should be applied:

- Capitalize the first word of the title/heading and of any subtitle/subheading
- Capitalize all major words (nouns, verbs including phrasal verbs such as "play with", adjectives, adverbs, and pronouns) in the title/heading, including the second part of hyphenated major words (e.g., Self-Report not Self-report)
- Capitalize all words of four letters or more.
- Lowercase the second word after a hyphenated prefix (e.g., Mid-, Anti-, Super-, etc.) in compound modifiers (e.g., Mid-year, Anti-hero, etc.).

=== Associated Press Stylebook ===
According to the Associated Press Stylebook (2020 edition, 55th edition), written by the Associated Press in the U.S., the following rules should be applied:

- Capitalize the principal words.
- Capitalize prepositions and conjunctions of four letters or more.
- Lowercase the articles the, a, and an.
- Capitalize the first and last words (overrides the rules above).
- Capitalize the "to" in infinitives (e.g., I Want To Play Guitar).

=== The Bluebook ===
According to the 21st edition of The Bluebook, written by a consortium of U.S. publishers for citing legal publications, the following title capitalization rules should be applied:

- Capitalize the first and the last word.
- Capitalize nouns, pronouns, adjectives, verbs (including phrasal verbs such as "play with"), adverbs, and subordinate conjunctions.
- Lowercase articles (a, an, the), coordinating conjunctions, and prepositions of four letters or fewer.
- Lowercase "to" in infinitives (though not defined in the stylebook).

=== Chicago Manual of Style ===
According to The Chicago Manual of Style (15th edition), written by staff of the University of Chicago Press, the following rules should be applied:

- Always capitalize "major" words (nouns, pronouns, verbs, adjectives, adverbs, and some conjunctions).
- Lowercase the conjunctions and, but, for, or, and nor.
- Lowercase the articles the, a, and an.
- Lowercase prepositions, regardless of length, except when they are stressed, are used adverbially or adjectivally, or are used as conjunctions.
- Lowercase the words to and as.
- Lowercase the second part of scientific names of organisms.
- Lowercase the second word after a hyphenated prefix in compound modifiers (e.g. Mid-year, Anti-hero).
- Always capitalize the first and last words of titles and subtitles (overrides the rules above).

Since the 17th edition (2010), the second word after a hyphenated prefix in compound modifiers is capitalized (Mid-Year, Anti-Hero).

Since the 18th edition (2024), prepositions of more than four letters are capitalized.

=== Hart's Rules ===
New Hart's Rules, the style guide for Oxford University Press, offers the following guidelines:

- The first word is always capitalized.
- Nouns, verbs, and adjectives (except possessives) are usually capitalized.
- Pronouns and adverbs may or may not be capitalized.
- Articles, conjunctions, and prepositions are normally not capitalized.

However, judgement is allowed based on factors such as sense, emphasis, structure, and length when deciding which words to capitalize.

=== MLA Handbook ===
According to the 9th edition of the MLA Handbook, published by the Modern Language Association of the U.S., the following title capitalization rules should be applied:

- Capitalize the first word of the title/heading and of any subtitle/subheading.
- Capitalize all major words (nouns, verbs including phrasal verbs such as "play with", adjectives, adverbs, and pronouns) in the title/heading, including the second part of hyphenated major words (e.g., Self-Report not Self-report).
- Lowercase the second word after a hyphenated prefix (e.g., Mid-, Anti-, Super-, etc.) in compound modifiers (e.g., Mid-year, Anti-hero, etc.).
- Do not capitalize articles, prepositions (regardless of length), and coordinating conjunctions.
- Do not capitalize "to" in infinitives (e.g., I Want to Play Guitar).

== Title case in references ==
The use of title case or sentence case in the references of scholarly publications is determined by the citation style used and can differ from the usage in title or headings. For example, APA style uses sentence case for the title of the cited work in the list of references, but it uses title case for the title of the current publication (or for the title of a publication if it is mentioned in the text instead). Moreover, it uses title case for the title of periodicals even in the references. Other citation styles like Chicago Manual of Style use title case also for the title of cited works in the list of references.

== See also ==
- Truecasing
