= English auxiliary verbs =

Small set of grammatically distinctive verbs of English

English auxiliary verbs are a small set of English verbs, which include the English modal auxiliary verbs and a few others. Although the auxiliary verbs of English are widely believed to lack inherent semantic meaning and instead to modify the meaning of the verbs they accompany, they are nowadays classed by linguists as auxiliary on the basis not of semantic but of grammatical properties: among these, that they invert with their subjects in interrogative main clauses (Has John arrived?) and are negated either by the simple addition of not (He has not arrived) or (with very few exceptions) by negative inflection (He hasn't arrived).

== History of the concept ==
When describing English, the adjective auxiliary was "formerly applied to any formative or subordinate elements of language, e.g. prefixes, prepositions." As applied to verbs, its conception was originally rather vague and varied significantly.

=== Some historical examples ===
The first English grammar, Bref Grammar for English by William Bullokar, published in 1586, does not use the term "auxiliary" but says:

All other verbs are called verbs-neuters-un-perfect because they require the infinitive mood of another verb to express their signification of meaning perfectly: and be these, may, can, might or mought, could, would, should, must, ought, and sometimes, will, that being a mere sign of the future tense. [orthography standardized and modernized]

In volume 5 (1762) of Tristram Shandy, the narrator's father explains that "The verbs auxiliary we are concerned in here, . . . , are, am; was; have; had; do; did; make; made; suffer; shall; should; will; would; can; could; owe; ought; used; or is wont."

Charles Wiseman's Complete English Grammar of 1764 notes that most verbs

cannot be conjugated through all their Moods and Tenses, without one of the following principal Verbs have and be. The first serves to conjugate the rest, by supplying the compound tenses of all Verbs both Regular and Irregular, whether Active, Passive, Neuter, or Impersonal, as may be seen in its own variation, &c. (Note: Wiseman uses "regular", "irregular", "active" and "passive" with the meanings they still have in relation to verbs. A "neuter verb", he writes: "Comes from the Latin neuter, neither, because it is neither Active nor Passive, it denotes the existence of a person or thing, making a complete sense of itself, and requires no noun or other word to be joined with it, as, I sleep, we run, she cries, &c." An "impersonal verb", he writes, is one: "Having only the third person singular and plural applied to things both animate and inanimate, as, it freezes, it is said or they say, they grow, &c.")

Along with have and be, it goes on to include do, may, can, shall, will as auxiliary verbs.

W. C. Fowler's The English Language of 1857 says:

Auxiliary Verbs, or Helping Verbs, perform the same office in the conjugation of principal verbs which inflection does in the classical languages, though even in those languages the substantive verb is sometimes used as a helping verb. . . . I. The verbs that are always auxiliary to others are, May, can, shall, must; II. Those that are sometimes auxiliary and sometimes principal verbs are, Will, have, do, be, and let.

The verbs that all the sources cited above agree are auxiliary verbs are the modal auxiliary verbs may, can, and shall; most also include be, do, and have.

=== Auxiliary verbs as heads ===
Modern grammars do not differ substantially over membership in the list of auxiliary verbs, though they have refined the concept and, following an idea first put forward by John Ross in 1969, have tended to take the auxiliary verb not as subordinate to a "main verb" (a concept that pedagogical grammars perpetuate), but instead as the head of a verb phrase. Examples include The Cambridge Grammar of the English Language and Bas Aarts' Oxford Modern English Grammar. This is shown in the tree diagram below for the clause I can swim.

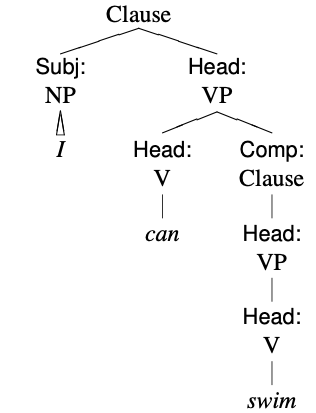

The clause has a subject noun phrase I and a head verb phrase (VP), headed by the auxiliary verb can. The VP also has a complement clause, which has a head VP, with the head verb swim.

=== Recent definitions ===
A Comprehensive Grammar of the English Language (1985) says of "verbs in auxiliary function" that "In contrast to full [i.e. lexical] verbs, [these verbs] are capable of functioning as auxiliary or 'helping' verbs (cf 2.27f)", which seems to refer back to a table showing the "main verb" (sink in various inflected forms) following one to four auxiliary verbs (be and have, again in various inflected forms; and may and must). It is not obvious how this definition would exclude lexical verbs such as try (in tried sinking, tried to have sunk, tried being sunk, etc) – although they would certainly fail the book's own list of criteria for auxiliary verbs, as listed later.

In his book English Auxiliaries: History and Structure (1993), Anthony R. Warner writes that the English auxiliary verbs "are rather sharply defined as a group by distinctive formal properties."

The Cambridge Grammar of the English Language (2002) describes auxiliary verbs as "a small list of verbs with very specific syntactic properties", differing from "all the rest of the verbs in the dictionary, which we will call the lexical verbs . . . in inflectional morphology as well as syntax" And later: "A general definition of auxiliary verb is that it denotes a closed class of verbs that are characteristically used as markers of tense, aspect, mood, and voice." It too adds a list of criteria.

== Auxiliary verbs distinguished grammatically ==
The list of auxiliary verbs in Modern English, along with their inflected forms, is shown in the following table.

Contractions are only shown if their orthography is distinctive. There are also numerous unstressed versions that are typically, although not necessarily, written in the standard way. For these, see a later section. Where there is a blank, the auxiliary verb lacks this form. (In some cases, a corresponding lexical verb may have the form. For example, although lexical verb need has a plain past tense form, auxiliary verb need does not.)

English auxiliary verb paradigm
Citation form	Modal/ Non-modal	Plain	Present tense			Past tense			Participles		Confusible lexical homonym? (Note: More precisely: Does there exist a lexical verb with the same spelling and pronunciation that is synonymous or could be said to have an auxiliary (or copular) function? (Ignored here is any lexical verb – will meaning "exert one's will in an attempt to compel", can meaning "insert into cans", etc – that is unlikely to be mistaken for the auxiliary verb.))
Citation form	Modal/ Non-modal	Plain	Neutral	Contr.	Negative	Neutral	Contr.	Negative	Present	Past	Confusible lexical homonym?
will	Modal		will	'll	won't	would	'd	wouldn't			none
may (Note: "[T]here is evidence that for some speakers [of Standard English] may and might have diverged to the extent that they are no longer inflectional forms of a single lexeme, but belong to distinct lexemes, may and might, each of which – like must – lacks a preterite. . . .")	Modal		may			might		mightn't			none
can	Modal		can		can't, cannot	could		couldn't			none
shall	Modal		shall	'll	shan't	should		shouldn't			none
must	Modal		must		mustn't						none
ought	Modal		ought		oughtn't						exists (Note: The use of ought as a lexical verb as in They didn’t ought to go is generally thought of as restricted to non-standard dialects but has been described as also sometimes found in informal standard usage. "Lexical ought with the dummy operator do has been condemned in British usage handbooks. . . . What this censure suggests is that lexical ought with periphrastic do is a well-established usage in colloquial [British English].")
need (Note: An NPI, rare for speakers of Standard American English.)	Modal		need		needn't						exists
dare	Modal		dare		daren't	dared					exists (Note: The distinction between auxiliary and lexical is blurred: "lexical dare commonly occurs in non-affirmative contexts without to": She wouldn't dare ask her father; and it also "can be stranded", as in She ought to have asked for a raise, but she didn't dare.)
be	Non-modal	be	am, is, are	'm, 's, 're	%ain't, (Note: This article uses an asterisk ⟨*⟩ to indicate ungrammatical examples; a percent sign ⟨%⟩ to indicate grammaticality for some speakers of English but not others; and a number sign ⟨#⟩ to indicate semantic or pragmatic oddity despite grammaticality.) isn't, aren't	was, were		wasn't, weren't	being	been	exists (Note: Almost exclusively an NPI, found in the contexts exemplified by If you don't be quiet I'll ground you and Why don't you be quiet?)
do	Non-modal	do (Note: Used for the imperative, as in Do be quiet. Uniquely among English auxiliary verbs, untensed do also has a negative inflected form: don't, as in Don't be noisy.)	does, do	's (Note: In questions like What's he do?, rarely written.)	doesn't, don't	did	'd (Note: In questions like What'd he do?, rarely written.), d'	didn't			exists
have	Non-modal	have	has, have	's, 've	hasn't, haven't	had	'd	hadn't	having		exists

A major difference between the results, shown above, of defining auxiliary verbs syntactically and doing so based on a notion of "helping" is that the syntactic definition includes:

- be even when used simply as a copular verb (I am hungry; It was a cat)
- idioms using would (would rather, would sooner, would as soon) that take a finite clause complement (I'd rather you went)
- have with no other verb (as in %Have you any change?): uses where it cannot be said to "help" any other verb.

=== Archaic forms of be, do, and have ===
A study of 17th-century American English found the form be used for the 1st and 3rd person plural present; was for the 3rd person plural preterite; art and are for the 2nd person singular present; wast and wert for the 2nd person singular preterite; and dost and hast (2nd person) and doth and hath (3rd person) for the singular present.

=== The NICE criteria ===
One set of criteria for distinguishing between auxiliary and lexical verbs is F. R. Palmer's "NICE": "Basically the criteria are that the auxiliary verbs occur with negation, inversion, 'code', and emphatic affirmation while the [lexical] verbs do not." (Note: Rather than "lexical verb", Palmer uses the term "full verb".)

The NICE properties
	Auxiliary verb	Lexical verb
Negation	I will not eat apples. I won't eat apples.	*I eat not apples. *I eatn't apples.
Inversion	Has Lee eaten apples?	*Eats Lee apples?
Code	Can it devour 3 kg of meat? Yes it can.	Does it devour 3 kg of meat? *Yes it devours.
Emphatic affirmation	You say we're not ready? We are ready.	You say we didn't practise enough? *We practised enough.

==== NICE: Negation ====
Clausal negation (Note: Clausal negation can be tested by adding a straightforward interrogative tag (one simply asking for confirmation, not expressing incredulity, admiration, etc). A negative clause calls for a positive interrogative tag (and a positive clause calls for a negative one); thus the positive Do you? within You don't eat beef, do you? shows that You don't eat beef is negative. Despite lacking an auxiliary verb, You never/seldom/rarely eat beef is also negative.) most commonly employs an auxiliary verb, for example, We can't believe it'll rain today or I don't need an umbrella. As late as Middle English, lexical verbs could also participate in clausal negation, so a clause like Lee eats not apples would have been grammatical, but this is no longer possible in Modern English, where lexical verbs require "do‑support".

(At first glance, the grammaticality of I hope/guess/suppose/think not may suggest that some lexical verbs too have no need for do‑support; but ungrammatical *I hope/guess/suppose/think not you are right shows that this is quite mistaken. Not in these examples does not negate a clause but is instead the negative equivalent of so, a pro-form for a negative proposition.)

Palmer writes that the "Negation" criterion is "whether [the verb] occurs with the negative particle not, or more strictly, whether it has a negative form", the latter referring to negatively inflected won't, hasn't, haven't, etc. (As seen in the paradigm table above, in today's Standard English not every auxiliary verb has such a form.)

==== NICE: Inversion ====
Although English is a subject–verb–object language, an interrogative main clause is the most important among several constructions that put a verb before the subject. This is called subject–auxiliary inversion because only auxiliary verbs participate in such constructions: Can/should/must Lee eat apples?; Never have I enjoyed a quince. Again, in Middle English, lexical verbs were no different; but in Modern English *Eats Lee apples? and *Never enjoy I a quince are ungrammatical, and do‑support is again required: Does Lee eat apples?; Never do I enjoy quinces.

==== NICE: Code ====
F. R. Palmer attributes this term to J. R. Firth, writing:

There are sentences in English in which a full verb is later 'picked up' by an auxiliary. The position is very similar to that of a noun being 'picked up' by a pronoun. [. . .] If the initial sentence, which contains the main verb, is not heard, all the remainder is unintelligible; it is, in fact, truly in code. The following example is from Firth:

Do you think he will?
I don't know. He might.
I suppose he ought to, but perhaps he feels he can't.
Well, his brothers have. They perhaps think he needn't.
Perhaps eventually he may. I think he should, and I very much hope he will.

(What "picks up" is called an anaphor; what is picked up is called an antecedent.) Attempting to remove the complement(s) of a lexical verb normally has an ungrammatical result (Did you put it in the fridge? / *Yes, I put) or an inappropriate one (Did you eat the chicken? / #Yes, I ate). However, if a number of conditions are met, the result may be acceptable.

==== NICE: Emphatic affirmation ====
F. R. Palmer writes that "a characteristic of the auxiliaries is their use in emphatic affirmation with nuclear stress upon the auxiliary", as in You must see him. He concedes that "any verbal form may have nuclear stress"; thus We saw them; however, auxiliaries stressed in this way are used for "the denial of the negative", whereas lexical verbs again use do‑support.

- You say you heard them? / No, we saw them.
- You can't have seen them. / We did see them.

NICE is widely cited (with "emphatic affirmation" usually simplified as "emphasis"): as examples, by A Comprehensive Grammar of the English Language (1985), (Note: The authors use NICE but do not name it.) The Cambridge Grammar of the English Language (2002), and the Oxford Modern English Grammar (2011).

=== The NICER criteria ===
A revised set of criteria, NICER, owes much to NICE but does more than merely add a fifth criterion to it.

The NICER properties
	Auxiliary verb	Lexical verb
(Finite) Negation	Lee will not eat apples.	*Lee eats not apples.
Auxiliary-initial constructions	Has Lee eaten apples?	*Eats Lee apples?
"Contraction" of not	didn't, shouldn't, isn't	*eatn't, *gon't, *maken't
(Post-auxiliary) Ellipsis	Lee was eating and Kim was too.	*Lee kept eating and Kim kept too.
Rebuttal	A: We shouldn't eat apples. B: We should so.	A: We didn't try to eat apples. B: *We tried so.

In this section, a number of verbs – not limited to those in the paradigm table above – are checked against four of the five criteria of NICER. As would, might, could and should are sometimes understood as discrete verbs (and not merely as the preterite forms of will, may, can and shall), they are tested too.

==== NICER: Negation ====
Auxiliary verbs can be negated with not; lexical verbs require do-support: a less stringent version of "negation" as the first criterion of NICE.

We add not immediately after the verb, and obtain: She will/would/may/might/can/could/shall/should/must/need/dare not live there. Each of these has clausal negation, as we see by adding a positive tag and thereby creating a straightforward question: She can not live there, can she?; She need not live there, need she?; and so forth. (Compare She can live there, can she? and She needs to live there, does she?. In both of these a positive tag is added to a positive clause, for a result that is not a straightforward question. Context and tone of voice may suggest that the speaker is impressed or incredulous.)

Similarly for She ought/used not to live there; She is not a resident; She does not live there; and She has not lived there; and indeed for She wants to not go, awkward though this may sound.

This criterion does not require the same verb for the tag as in the anchor (the part of the sentence that precedes the tag). So the informal better works as well: She better not be late, had she? Irrespective of any tag, lexical do does not work (*You did not your homework), and neither does go (*He goes not to school). Putting not immediately after some other lexical verbs brings a grammatical result (He seems/intends not to live there), but one that does not work as expected with a positive tag – He seems/intends not to live there, does he? do not straightforwardly ask – showing that what not has negated is not the clause as a whole.

==== NICER: Auxiliary-initial constructions ====
The same as "inversion" as the second criterion of NICE.

Will/would/may/might/can/could/shall/should/must/need/dare I wear a mankini? – all of these can invert with the subject.

Likewise for Ought/used/have you to wear a suit?; Am I forced to wear a suit?; and Do I wear a suit?

This again accounts for all of the verbs in the paradigm table above, other than to. The construction requires a tensed form of the verb; to lacks one, and therefore this criterion does not apply to it.

Attempts to invert lexical verbs such as do (*Did you your homework?) or go (*Goes he to school?) bring ungrammatical results. Surprisingly, How goes it? is grammatical; but even a minor adjustment to it (*How went it?; *How goes your job?) brings an ungrammatical result, showing that it is merely a fixed formula.

==== NICER: "Contraction" of not ====
Most English auxiliary verbs have a negative inflected form with -n't, commonly regarded as a contracted form of not. Available are won't, wouldn't, mightn't, can't, couldn't, shan't, shouldn't, mustn't, oughtn't, needn't, aren't, isn't, wasn't, weren't, daren't, don't, doesn't, didn't, haven't, hasn't, hadn't, and %usedn't.

No lexical verb has such a form (*She gon't to bars much these days; *She didn't her homework last week).

A small number of defective auxiliary verbs lack this inflection: %mayn't and *daredn't are now dated, and there is no universally accepted negative inflection of am: %amn't is dialectal, the acceptability of ain't depends on the variety of Standard English, and aren't is only used when it and I are inverted (Aren't I invited?, compare *I aren't tired).

For do, must, used (/just/), and (depending on the variety of Standard English) can, the negative inflected form is spelt as expected but its pronunciation is anomalous (change of vowel in don't and perhaps can't; elision of /t/ within the root of mustn't and usedn't); for shan't and won't, both the pronunciation and the spelling are anomalous.

==== NICER: Post-auxiliary ellipsis ====
The same as "code" as the third criterion of NICE.

The possibility of ellipsis with will, may, might, can't, should, needn't and have (and indeed to) is illustrated in Firth's example of "code".

As for the other auxiliary verbs:

- I'll attend if I must/dare/%ought.
- If you're attending then I shall/am.
- I'd be grateful if you would/could/did.
- I'll go if you do.
- I haven't swum much recently but I used/ought/want/hope to.

This is not possible with used (although it was in the past (Note: Otto Jespersen points to an example by Leigh Hunt: "I did not stammer half so badly as I used".)), or with most lexical verbs: *I haven't swum much recently but I used/want/hope.

It does however work with a number of lexical verbs: I'd be grateful if you tried/started/stopped.

==== NICER: Rebuttal ====
When two people are arguing, one may use a stressed too or so immediately after the auxiliary verb to deny a statement made by the other. For example, having been told that he didn't do his homework, a child may reply I did too. (Or anyway, this is true for US English. For British English, indeed.) This kind of rebuttal is impossible with lexical verbs.

=== Additional criteria ===
Each of the two most compendious of postwar reference grammars of English offers a more detailed list of criteria for auxiliary verbs.

A Comprehensive Grammar of the English Language has eight criteria. The first five of these approximate to the four of NICE, with the addition of cliticization as in It's raining or I've finished. Slightly simplified, the sixth is that auxiliary verbs, unlike lexical verbs, "typically, but not necessarily" precede adverbs such as always, never, certainly and probably: He would always visit her (compare lexical verb visit in *He visited always her). The seventh is that "Quantifiers like all, both, and each which modify the subject of the clause may occur after the [verb] as an alternative, in many instances, to the predeterminer position"; thus either Both their children will attend or Their children will both attend (compare lexical verb attend in *Their children attended both). (Note: If the context for Their children attended both is a discussion of two weddings, then it is of course grammatical. But if the intended meaning is instead "Both their children attended", it is not.) The last is "Independence of subject", a claim that, compared with most lexical verbs, auxiliary verbs can be semantically independent of their subjects. This in turn is claimed to be manifested in three ways. (The book provides four additional criteria for modal auxiliary verbs.)

The Cambridge Grammar of the English Language adopts NICE and criteria approximating to the sixth and seventh of Comprehensive Grammar, although it dispenses with the eighth. (It provides five additional criteria for modal auxiliary verbs.)

=== Boundary fuzziness ===
Linguists who cite or propound clear grammatical criteria for auxiliary verbs then proceed to include among auxiliary verbs certain verbs that do not meet all these criteria. Having said that the English auxiliary verbs (Note: Warner's distinction is not between "auxiliary verbs" and "lexical verbs", but instead between "auxiliaries" and "verbs". His terminology has been adjusted for this article. The issue is not just one of naming; however, an account of the argument over whether what this article calls auxiliary verbs comprise a subcategory of "verbs" (as assumed in this article) or instead comprise an independent category (as Warner holds) is beyond the scope of this article.) "are rather sharply defined . . . by distinctive formal properties", Anthony R. Warner points out that a class:

normally has some internal differentiation whereby a "nuclear" or "prototypical" (Note: Later in the book, Warner makes an appeal to prototype theory.) set of members shows more of the properties of the class than other less fully characterized members. A class may also not show sharply definable boundaries.

He claims that what are the prototypical auxiliary verbs are the modal auxiliary verbs (other than ought, need, and dare) and that:

the presence of [be, do and have] in the category [auxiliary verb] is justified from a semantic point of view not so much by their possession of prototypical properties as by the fact that they are even more remote [than are the modal auxiliary verbs] from the [lexical verb] prototype, which denotes an action or event. . . .

=== Infinitival to ===
Various linguists, notably Geoff Pullum, have suggested that the to of I want to go (not the preposition to as in I went to Rome) is a special case of an auxiliary verb with no tensed forms. (Note: Pullum credits unpublished insights of Paul Postal and Richard Hudson, and published work by Robert Fiengo.) Rodney Huddleston argues against this position in The Cambridge Grammar of the English Language, but Robert Levine counters these arguments. In a book on the historical emergence and spread of infinitival to, Bettelou Los calls Pullum's arguments that it is an auxiliary verb "compelling".

In terms of the NICER properties, examples like it's fine not to go show that to allows negation. Inversion, contraction of not, and rebuttal would only apply to tensed forms, and to is argued to have none. Although rebuttal is not possible, it does allow ellipsis: I don't want to.

=== (Had) better, (woul)d rather, and others ===
With their normal senses (as in You had better/best arrive early), had/'d better and had/'d best are not about the past. Indeed they do not seem to be usable for the past (*Yesterday I had better return home before the rain started); and they do not occur with other forms of have (*have/has better/best). The Cambridge Grammar of the English Language observes:

If we take [the had in had better] as a distinct lexeme, we will say that it has been reanalysed as a present tense form (like must and ought). . . . [In view of its syntactic behaviour], it undoubtedly should be included among the non-central members of the modal auxiliary class.

Expressions ranging from had better to would rather have been argued to comprise "a family of morphosyntactic configurations with a moderate degree of formal and semantic homogeneity". They would be:

- Superlative modals: had best, 'd best
- Comparative modals: had better, 'd better, better, would rather, 'd rather, had rather, should rather, would sooner, 'd sooner, had sooner, should sooner
- Equative modals: would (just) as soon as, may (just) as well, might (just) as well

Among these, had better, 'd better, better occur the most commonly. They express either advice or a strong hope: a deontic and an optative sense respectively.

Among these three forms, 'd better is the commonest in British English and plain better the commonest in American English. However, the syntactic category of plain better when used in this or a similar way is not always clear: while it may have been reanalysed as an independent modal auxiliary verb – one with no preterite form and also no ability to invert (*Better I leave now?) – it can be an adverb instead of a verb.

For more about would rather/sooner and would as soon, see Would rather, would sooner, and would as soon.

== Contributions by auxiliaries to meaning and syntax ==
An auxiliary verb is traditionally understood as a verb that "helps" another verb by adding (only) grammatical information to it. (Note: The Oxford English Dictionary, 2nd edition, 1989, defines an auxiliary verb as "a verb used to form the tenses, moods, voices, etc. of other verbs".) So understood, English auxiliaries include:

- Do when used to form questions (Do you want tea?), to negate (I don't want coffee), or to emphasize (I do want tea) (see do-support)
- Have when used to express perfect aspect (He had given his all)
- Be when used to express progressive aspect (They were singing) or passive voice (It was destroyed)
- The modal auxiliary verbs, used with a variety of meanings, principally relating to modality (He can do it now)

However, this understanding of auxiliaries has trouble with be (He wasn't asleep; Was he asleep?), have (%He hadn't any money), and would (Would you rather we left now?), each of which behaves syntactically like an auxiliary verb even when not accompanying another verb (or not merely doing so). Other approaches to defining auxiliary verbs are described below.

=== Be ===
==== Passive voice ====
Be, followed by the past participle of a lexical verb, realizes the passive voice: He was promoted. Its negative and interrogative versions (He wasn't promoted; Was he promoted?), lacking the need for do‑support, show that this is auxiliary be. (This simple test can be repeated for the other applications of be briefly described below.)

(However, the lexical verb get can also form a passive clause: He got promoted. This is a long-established construction.)

Followed by the present participle of a verb (whether lexical or auxiliary), be realizes the progressive aspect: He was promoting the film.

Either may be confused with the use of a participial adjective (that is, an adjective derived from and homonymous with a participle): He was excited; It was exciting. (Note: Very simply, if the word ending -ing can take an object; it is a verb; if it can be modified by either too in the sense of "excessively" or very, it is an adjective. (NB if it cannot take an object, it is not necessarily an adjective; if it cannot be so modified by too or very, it is not necessarily a verb. There are also participial prepositions and other complications.))

==== Other uses ====
What The Cambridge Grammar of the English Language terms quasi-modal be normally imparts a deontic meaning: that of He is never to come here again approximates to that of "He must never come here again". In conditional contexts, was to (if both informal and with a singular subject) or were to imparts remoteness: If I were to jump out of the plane, . . . (compare with the open conditional If I jumped out of the plane, . . .). In common with modal auxiliary verbs, quasi-modal be has no secondary form.

What the same work terms motional be only occurs as been, when it follows the verb have in a perfect construction and is not followed by any verb: I've twice been to Minsk. Most of the NICE/NICER criteria are inapplicable, but sentences such as I don't need to go to the Grand People's Study House as I've already been show that it satisfies the "code" and "ellipsis" criteria of NICE and NICER respectively and thus is auxiliary rather than lexical be.

What the Cambridge Grammar terms copular be links a subject, typically a noun phrase, and a predicative complement, typically a noun phrase, adjective phrase, or preposition phrase. Ascriptive copular be ascribes a property to the subject (The car was a wreck); specifying copular be identifies the subject (The woman in the green shoes is my aunt Louise) and can be reversed with a grammatical result (My aunt Louise is the woman in the green shoes). Be in an it‑cleft (It was my aunt Louise who wore the green shoes) is specifying.

Auxiliary be also takes as complements a variety of words (able, about, bound, going and supposed among them) that in turn take as complements to‑infinitival subordinate clauses for results that are highly idiomatic (was about/supposed to depart, etc).

In Early Modern English, perfect tenses could be formed with either have (as today) or be. The latter pattern persisted into the 19th century: a character in Pride and Prejudice says, But before I am run away with by my feelings on this subject, perhaps it will be advisable for me to state my reasons for marrying.

=== Do ===
==== Do-support ====
The auxiliary verb do is primarily used for do‑support. This in turn is used for negation, interrogative main clauses, and more.

If a positive main clause is headed by an auxiliary verb, either the addition of not or (for most auxiliary verbs) a ‑n't inflection can negate. So They could reach home before dark becomes They couldn't reach home before dark. (This is the "negation" of NICE and NICER.) However, a lexical verb has to be supported by the verb do; so They reached home before dark becomes They didn't reach home before dark.

If a declarative main clause is headed by an auxiliary verb, simple inversion of subject and verb will create a closed interrogative clause. So They could reach home before dark becomes Could they reach home before dark?. (This is the "inversion" of NICE and NICER.) However, a lexical verb requires do; so They reached home before dark becomes Did they reach home before dark? For an open interrogative clause, do has the same role: How far did you get?

Although interrogative main clauses are by far the most obvious contexts for inversion using do‑support, there are others: While exclamative clauses usually lack subject–auxiliary inversion (What a foolish girl I was), it is a possibility (What a foolish girl was I); the inverted alternative to How wonderful it tasted! would be How wonderful did it taste! A negative constituent that is not the subject can move to the front and trigger such inversion: None of the bottles did they leave unopened. A phrase with only can do the same: Only once did I win a medal. Ditto for phrases starting with so and such: So hard/Such a beating did Douglas give Tyson that Tyson lost. And in somewhat old-fashioned or formal writing, a miscellany of other constituents can be moved to the front with the same effect: Well do I remember, not so much the whipping, as the being shut up in a dark closet behind the study;for years and years did they believe that France was on the brink of ruin.

Negative imperative sentences require auxiliary do, even when there is another auxiliary verb. The declarative sentence They were goofing off is grammatical with the single auxiliary be; but the imperative sentence Don't be goofing off when the principal walks in adds don't. (Optionally, you may be added in front of or immediately after don't. A longer subject would normally come after: Don't any of you be goofing off. . . .)

==== Emphatic polarity ====
Other than via a negative inflection (don't, doesn't), the verb do does not typically contribute any change in meaning, except when used to add emphasis to an accompanying verb. This is described as an emphatic construction, as an emphatic version of the declarative clause, as having emphatic polarity, or is called the emphatic mood: An example would be (i) I do run five kilometres every morning (with intonational stress placed on do), compared to plain (ii) I run five kilometres every morning. It also differs from (iii) I run five kilometres every morning (with the stress on run): A context for (i), with its "emphasis on positive polarity", would be an allegation that the speaker didn't do so every morning; for (iii), with its "emphasis on lexical content", an allegation that the speaker merely walked. Do can be used for emphasis on negative polarity as well: He never did remember my birthday.

For emphatic positive polarity in imperatives, do is again added; thus standard Be quiet becomes emphatically positive Do be quiet.

=== Have ===
==== Perfect tenses ====
Followed by the past participle of a verb (whether lexical or auxiliary), the auxiliary verb have realizes a perfect tense: Has she visited Qom?; Has she been to Qom?. In addition to its tensed forms (have/‑ve, has/‑s, had/‑d, haven't, hasn't, hadn't), it has a plain form (She could have arrived) and a present participle (I regret having lost it), but no past participle.

("Perfect" is a syntactic term; in the context of English, "perfective" is a matter of semantic interpretation. Unlike, say, Slavic languages, which do have direct grammatical expression of perfectivity, in English, a sentence using a perfect tense may or may not have a perfective interpretation.)

The present perfect tense is illustrated by I've left it somewhere; the past perfect (also called the preterite perfect) tense by I'd left it somewhere. A full description of their uses is necessarily complex: the discussion in The Cambridge Grammar of the English Language is long and intricate.

The perfect is often considered as referring to an indefinite past: I've been to Oslo might raise the question of when, but is acceptable as is; by contrast, #I've been to Oslo in 2016, specifying the time, would be strange. A more careful analysis brings the continuative perfect, the experiential (or existential) perfect, the resultative perfect, and the perfect of recent past. (Note: The classification and terms are derived from Bernard Comrie, although slightly revised.) The first, with an unspecified starting point and continuing uninterruptedly to the present, is illustrated by I've lived in Oslo since 2016; the experiential by Yes, I've watched a bullfight, and I never want to watch one again; the perfect of result by I've just watched a bullfight, and now I feel rather sick; and that of recent past by George Santos has just given a press conference (usable at the time of writing, but likely to become odder as time passes).

Very simply, the present perfect refers to the past in a way that has some relevance to the present. The perfect is also used in contexts that require both past reference and an untensed verb form (He seems to have left; Having left, he lit a cigarette).

Corpus-based research has shown that American English saw a marked decrease from around 1800 until the mid-20th century in the use of the present perfect, and that British English followed this in the late 20th century.

==== Other uses ====
When used to describe an event, have is exclusively a lexical verb (*Had you your teeth done?; Did you have your teeth done?; *Had you a nap?; Did you have a nap?). When used to describe a state, however, for many speakers (although for few Americans or younger people) there is also an auxiliary option: (he'd stop at a pub, settle up with a cheque because he hadn't any money on him; Hasn't he any friends of his own?; I'm afraid I haven't anything pithy to answer; This hasn't anything directly to do with religion). An alternative to auxiliary verb have in this sense is have got, although this is commoner among British speakers, and less formal (Has he got old news for you; It hasn’t got anything to do with the little green men and the blue orb; What right had he got to get on this train without a ticket?; Hasn't he got a toolbox?).

With their meaning of obligation, have to, has to and had to – rarely if ever rendered as 've to, 's to and 'd to – can use auxiliary have for inversion (if he wants to compel A. to do something to what Court has he to go?; How much further has he to go?; Now why has he to wait three weeks?), although lexical have is commoner.

=== Use ===
Use /jus/ (rhyming with loose) satisfies only one of The Cambridge Grammar of the English Language's five criteria for modal as distinct from other auxiliary verbs. "It is also semantically quite distinct from the modal auxiliaries: the meaning it expresses is aspectual, not modal."

Like ought, use is followed by a to-infinitival clause. Thus I used to go to college means that formerly the speaker habitually went to college, and normally implies that they no longer do so. Use is highly defective, existing only in preterite form. For some speakers of English as a first language (though very few Americans), it can follow auxiliary-verb syntax: some speakers of British English can form questions like Used he to come here? and negatives like He used not (rarely usedn't) to come here. Far commoner, however, is treatment of used as the preterite of a lexical verb.

Whether auxiliary or lexical, used expresses past states or past habitual actions, usually with the implication that they no longer continue. After noting how constructions employing used (We used to play tennis every week), would (We would play tennis every week), and the preterite alone (We played tennis every week) often seem to be interchangeable, Robert I. Binnick teases them apart, concluding that used is an "anti-present-perfect": whereas the present perfect "includes the present in what is essentially a period of the past", the used construction "precisely excludes [it]"; and further that

The whole point of the used to construction is not to report a habit in the past but rather to contrast a past era with the present. . . . It's . . . essentially a present tense. . . . Like the present perfect, it is about a state of affairs, not a series of occurrences.

Use is far more commonly encountered as a lexical than as an auxiliary verb, particularly for younger or American speakers. This forms questions and negatives with did. The plain form use (sometimes spelt ⟨used⟩) of the lexical verb is seen in Did you use to play tennis?). Its preterite perfect had used is rare but attested. A simple declarative (I often used to play tennis) could be either auxiliary or lexical.

Use of the preterite used should not be confused with that of the participial adjective (i.e. the adjective etymologically derived from the participle), meaning "familiar with", as in I am used to this, We must get used to the cold. (As is common for adjectives and impossible for verbs, used here can be modified by very.) When the participial adjective is followed by to and a verb, the latter is a gerund-participle: I am used to going to college in the mornings.

Data from a corpus of American and British spoken and written English of the 1980s and 1990s show that used not to, usedn't to (both auxiliary), and didn't use to (lexical) were then rare in both American and British English, other than used not to in British novels. Never used to is a commonly used alternative. Modal auxiliary use is not used in interrogatives in conversation (Used you to . . . ?); and even the lexical version with do-support (Did you use to . . . ?) is rare.

=== To ===
In the context for an argument that infinitival to is a subordinator, Rodney Huddleston points out that, just as for the subordinator that (I said (that) he could), there are contexts where to is optional, with no change in meaning. (Note: This appears within chapter 14, "Non-finite and verbless clauses", attributed to Huddleston alone.) His example is All I did was (to) ask a question; and from it he infers that to is meaningless.

Within an argument for categorizing to not as a subordinator but as an auxiliary verb, Robert D. Levine disagrees with the main thrust of Huddleston's argument, but not with the claim that to is meaningless – something that is also true of "dummy do" and copular be, both of them auxiliary verbs. Its function is purely syntactic.

=== Modal auxiliary verbs ===
The modal auxiliary verbs contribute meaning chiefly via modality, although some of them (particularly will and sometimes shall) express future time reference. Their uses are detailed at English modal verbs, and tables summarizing their principal meaning contributions can be found in the articles Modal verb and Auxiliary verb.

For more details on the uses of auxiliaries to express aspect, mood and time reference, see English clause syntax.

== Auxiliary verbs in sequence ==
=== Modal auxiliary verbs in sequence ===
As modal verbs only have tensed forms in Standard English, they would not be expected to appear in subordinate clauses, or in sequence (might be able to help them, but *might could help them). Yet what appear to be sequences of modal auxiliary verbs do occur: see "Double modals".

They can hardly be regarded as part of Standard English, and they are therefore ignored in the description below.

=== Other auxiliary verbs in sequence ===
There are constraints on the order within sequences of auxiliary verbs. As the modal auxiliary verbs and use only have tensed forms (or anyway only have these in Standard English), they can only go at the front. If we put aside the highly anomalous to, the order is then modal > perfect have > progressive be > passive be, and a lexical verb.

Patterns with two auxiliary verbs are exemplified by was being eaten, has been eaten, might be eaten, and might have eaten. Patterns with three include that exemplified by might have been eaten. Noting that "Structures containing two secondary forms of be (progressive and passive) [. . .] are avoided by some speakers, but they do occasionally occur", Huddleston and Pullum present will have been being taken as an example of a sequence with four.

== Unstressed and contracted forms ==
Contractions are a common feature of English, used frequently in ordinary speech. In written English, contractions are used in informal and sometimes in formal writing. They usually involve the elision of a vowel – an apostrophe being inserted in its place in written English – possibly accompanied by other changes. Many of these contractions involve auxiliary verbs.

Certain contractions tend to be restricted to less formal speech and very informal writing, such as John'd or Mary'd for "John/Mary would". (Compare the personal pronoun forms I'd and you'd, much more likely to be encountered in relatively informal writing.) This applies in particular to constructions involving consecutive contractions, such as wouldn't've for "would not have".

Contractions in English are generally not mandatory, as they are in some other languages, although in speech uncontracted forms may seem overly formal. They are often used for emphasis: I am ready! The uncontracted form of an auxiliary or copula must be used in elliptical sentences where its complement is omitted: Who's ready? / I am! (not *I'm!).

Some contractions lead to homophony, which sometimes causes errors in writing, such as confusing ‑'ve with of, as in "would of" for would have.

=== Unstressed and contracted forms of individual verbs ===
The lists below derive from F. R. Palmer's The English Verb and The Cambridge Grammar of the English Language.

For the contracted forms of the modal auxiliary verbs, see English modal auxiliary verbs.

==== Unstressed and contracted forms of be ====
- am /ˈæm/ → /əm/, /m/ ('m)
- is /ˈɪz/ → /z/ or /s/ ('s)
- are /ˈɑɹ/ → /əɹ/, /ɹ/ ('re)
- was /ˈwɒz/ → /wəz/
- were /ˈwəɹ/ → /ɹ/ ('re)
- be /ˈbi/ → /bɪ/
- been /ˈbin/ → /bɪn/

In a non-rhotic dialect, clitic-final /ɹ/ is only realized as [ɹ] (or similar) when followed by a vowel (They're tired, no /ɹ/; They're angry, with /ɹ/).

For the contraction options for is, consider Bill's arriving /ˈbɪlz əˈɹaɪvɪŋ/ versus Janet's coming /ˈd͡ʒænɪts ˈkʌmɪŋ/.

==== Unstressed and contracted forms of do ====
- does /ˈdʌz/ → /dəz/, /z/ or /s/ ('s)
- do /ˈdu/ → /də/, /d/ (d' or 'd)

For the alternative nonsyllabic options for does, consider When's Bill leave? /ˈwɛnz ˈbɪl ˈliv/ versus What's Bill do? /ˈwɒts ˈbɪl ˈdu/.

The form 'd might appear in for example What'd he do?, spoken informally.

Uniquely among the forms for any of the auxiliary verbs, d' is a proclitic. It attaches to the front of the single word you (D'you follow me?).

==== Unstressed and contracted forms of have ====
- have /ˈhæv/ → /həv/, /əv/, /v/ ('ve), /ə/ (woulda, musta, etc)
- has /ˈhæz/ → /həz/, /əz/, /z/ or /s/ ('s)
- had /ˈhæd/ → /həd/, /əd/, /d/ ('d)

For the alternative nonsyllabic options for has, consider Bill's arrived /ˈbɪlz əˈɹaɪvd/ versus Janet's come /ˈd͡ʒænɪts ˈkʌm/.

==== Unstressed form of to ====
- to /ˈtu/ → /tə/

=== Double contractions ===
Being clitics, the contractions can replace their full equivalents in most (although not all) contexts: thus we see ‑ve not only in They've left but also in My friends've left (or even in My friends I hadn't seen in three years've left); not only in You should've been there but also in You shouldn't've been there, in which a contraction has clitized onto an auxiliary verb with negative inflection.

Double contractions are possible. Will have broken is grammatical, and thus His arm/helmet/glasses/rib/collarbone/nose [etc] 'll've broken are all grammatical too.

== Negative inflected forms ==
Position of not/‑n't in a negative closed interrogative
	After, or as an inflectional suffix of, the auxiliary verb	After the subject
not	*Would not you like another glass?	Would you not like another glass?
-n't	Wouldn't you like another glass?	*Would you n't like another glass?

Contractions such as ‑d /(ə)d/ (from would) are clitics. By contrast, the ‑n't /(ə)nt/ of wouldn't is in reality a "contraction" only etymologically: wouldn't, isn't, haven't and so forth have long been inflected forms, and an auxiliary verb with negative inflection can behave differently from the combination of not and the same verb without the inflection:

This article will continue to use "contraction" to include early instances of what at the time may not have become inflected forms.

During the early 17th century, not lost its requirement for stress, and subsequently came to be written as ‑n't, particularly in comedies and in the mouths of rustic characters or others speaking nonstandard dialects. In the 19th and 20th centuries, the use of ‑n't in writing spread beyond drama and fiction to personal letters, journalism, and descriptive texts. An't, ben't, can't, don't, han't, shan't and won't were well established by the end of the 17th century; isn't, aren't, wasn't, weren't, didn't, doesn't, don't, hadn't, hasn't, haven't, can't, couldn't, daren't, mayn't (now obsolete or dialectal), mightn't, mustn't, needn't, shan't, shouldn't, won't and wouldn't by the end of the 18th; and oughtn't in the early 19th.

There were various other negative contractions that have not survived: as examples, Barron Brainerd cites A. C. Partridge as showing that from 1599 to 1632 Ben Jonson used i'not ("is not"), sha'not ("shall not"), wi'not ("will not"), wu'not and wou'not ("would not"), ha'not ("has/have not"), and do'not ("do not").

=== Negative inflection of am ===
Standard English has no first-person singular form corresponding to the isn't of it isn't and isn't it? that is completely unproblematic. However, the following informal or dialectal options have been used:

==== Amn't ====
Otto Jespersen calls amn't "unpronounceable" and Eric Partridge calls it "ugly", but it is the standard inflected form in some varieties, mainly Hiberno-English (Irish English) and Scottish English. In Hiberno-English the question form (amn't I?) is used more frequently than the declarative I amn't. (The standard I'm not is available as an alternative to I amn't in both Scottish English and Hiberno-English.) An example appears in a poem by Oliver St. John Gogarty: If anyone thinks that I amn't divine, / He gets no free drinks when I'm making the wine. These lines are quoted in James Joyce's Ulysses, which also contains other examples: Amn't I with you? Amn't I your girl? (spoken by Cissy Caffrey).

==== Amnae ====
Amnae exists in Scots, and has been borrowed into Scottish English by many speakers. It is used in declarative sentences rather than questions.

==== Ain't ====
Ain't is an inflected alternative to am not – and also to is not, was not, are not, were not, has not, and have not; and in some dialects also do not, does not, did not, cannot (or can not), could not, will not, would not and should not. The usage of ain't is a perennial subject of controversy in English. Geoffrey Nunberg has argued that ain't is used by Standard English speakers "to suggest that a fact is just obvious on the face of things".

==== Aren't ====
Aren't is a very common means of filling the "amn't gap" in questions: Aren't I lucky to have you around? It was common by the early 20th century: Otto Jespersen writing in a book published in 1917 that:

Nowadays [/ɑːnt/] is frequently heard, especially in tag-questions: I'm a bad boy [/ɑːntaɪ/], but when authors want to write it, they are naturally induced to write aren't. . . . I find the spelling aren't I or arn't I pretty frequently in George Eliot . . . but only to represent vulgar or dialectal speech. In the younger generation of writers, however, it is also found as belonging to educated speakers. . . . (Note: Jespersen provides lists of where examples may be found in the works of Eliot, Bennett, Benson, Galsworthy, Wells, Wilde and others. Rather than "/ɑːnt/" and "/ɑːntaɪ/?", Jespersen writes "[a·nt]" and "[a·nt ai?]" respectively.)

The style guides have disagreed on aren't: Eric Partridge considered the aren't in aren't I an "illogical and illiterate" spelling of "the phonetically natural and the philologically logical" a'n't; H. W. Fowler (as revised by Ernest Gowers) wrote that aren't I? was "colloquially respectable and almost universal". In 1979, however, it was described as "almost universal" among speakers of Standard English. As an alternative to am not, aren't developed from one pronunciation of an't (which itself developed in part from amn't). In non-rhotic dialects, aren't and an't are homophones, and the spelling ⟨aren't I⟩ began to replace ⟨an't I⟩ in the early 20th century, although examples of ⟨aren't I⟩ (or ⟨arn't I⟩) for am I not appear in the first half of the 19th century, as in arn't I listening; and isn't it only the breeze that's blowing the sheets and halliards about? from 1827.

==== An't ====
An't (sometimes a'n't) arose from "am not" (via "amn't") and "are not" almost simultaneously. "An't" first appears in print in the work of English Restoration playwrights. In 1695 "an't" was used for "am not", and as early as 1696 "an't" was used to mean "are not". "An't" for "is not" may have developed independently from its use for "am not" and "are not". "Isn't" was sometimes written as "in't" or "en't", which could have changed into "an't". "An't" for "is not" may also have filled a gap in the paradigm for the verb be. From 1749, an't with a long "a" sound began to be written as ain't. By this time, an't was already being used for "am not", "are not", and "is not". An't and ain't coexisted as written forms well into the 19th century.

==== Bain't ====
Bain't, apparently from "be not", is found in a number of works employing eye dialect, including J. Sheridan Le Fanu's Uncle Silas. It is also found in a ballad written in Newfoundland dialect.

=== Other negative inflections of have ===
Han't or ha'n't, an early contraction for has not and have not, developed from the elision of the s of has not and the v of have not. Han't also appeared in the work of English Restoration playwrights. Much like an't, han't was sometimes pronounced with a long a, yielding hain't. With H-dropping, the h of han't or hain't gradually disappeared in most dialects, and became ain't. Ain't as a contraction for has not/have not appeared in print as early as 1819. As with an't, hain't and ain't were found together late into the nineteenth century.

Hain't, in addition to being an antecedent of ain’t, is a contraction of has not and have not in some dialects of English, such as Appalachian English. It is reminiscent of hae (have) in Lowland Scots. In dialects that retain the distinction between hain't and ain't, hain't is used for contractions of to have not and ain't for contractions of to be not. In other dialects, hain't is used either in place of, or interchangeably with ain't. Hain't is seen for example in Chapter 33 of Mark Twain's Adventures of Huckleberry Finn: I hain't come back—I hain't been gone.

=== Other negative inflections of do ===
Don't is the Standard English negative inflected form of do. However, in nonstandard English it may also be used for third person singular: Emma? She don't live here anymore.
