= English clause syntax =

Clauses in English grammar

This article describes the syntax of clauses in the English language, chiefly in Modern English. A clause is often said to be the smallest grammatical unit that can express a complete proposition. But this semantic idea of a clause leaves out much of English clause syntax. For example, clauses can be questions, but questions are not propositions. A syntactic description of an English clause is that it is a subject and a verb. But this too fails, as a clause need not have a subject, as with the imperative, and, in many theories, an English clause may be verbless. The idea of what qualifies varies between theories and has changed over time.

== History of the concept ==
The earliest use of the word clause in Middle English is non-technical and similar to the current everyday meaning of phrase: "A sentence or clause, a brief statement, a short passage, a short text or quotation; in a ~, briefly, in short; (b) a written message or letter; a story; a long passage in an author's source."

The first English grammar, Pamphlet for Grammar by William Bullokar, was published in 1586 and briefly mentions clause once, without explaining the concept.

A technical meaning is evident from at least 1865, when Walter Scott Dalgleish describe a clause as "a term of a sentence containing a predicate within itself; as... a man who is wise."

In the early days of generative grammar, new conceptions of the clause were emerging. Paul Postal and Noam Chomsky argued that every verb phrase had a subject, even if none was expressed, (though Joan Bresnan and Michael Brame disagreed). As a result, every verb phrase (VP) was thought to head a clause.

The idea of verbless clauses was perhaps introduced by James McCawley in the early 1980s with examples like the underlined part of with John in jail... meaning "John is in jail".

== Types of clause in Modern English ==
Clauses can be classified as independent (main clauses) and dependent (subordinate clauses). An orthogonal way of classifying clauses is by the speech act they are typically associated with. This results in declarative (making a statement), interrogative (asking a question), exclamative (exclaiming), and imperative (giving an order) clauses, each with its distinctive syntactic features. Declarative and interrogative clauses may be independent or dependent, but imperative clauses are only independent.

Dependent clauses have other cross-cutting types. These include relative and comparative clauses; and participial and infinitival clauses.

Finally, there are verbless clauses.

=== Examples ===
English Clause types
	Independent	Dependent (underlined)
Declarative	This is a tree.	I think (that) this is a tree.
Interrogative	Is this a tree? What is this?	I wonder whether / if this is a tree. I wonder what this is.
Imperative	Be still. Stop.	
Exclamative	What a tall tree that is!	Did you see what a tall tree it is?
Relative		This is the tree (that) I saw. The tree is in my yard, where I planted it. This is a tree to behold.
Comparative		This tree is taller than that one is.
Infinitival		I can see it. I want to see it.
Participial		I'm looking at the tree. I'm shaded by the tree.
Verbless	What a great thing to do! How odd that nobody noticed! Out of my way!	He stood there quietly, his hands in his pockets. Whether a fact or not, it is commonly believed. Whatever the reason, it's annoying. He didn't love her as much as she him. The bramble shook as if alive.

=== Independent clause types ===
==== Declarative ====
By far, the most common type of English clause is the independent declarative. The typical form of such clauses consist of two constituents, a subject and a head verb phrase (VP) in that order, with the subject corresponding to the predicand and the head VP corresponding to the predicate. For example, the clause Jo did it has the subject noun phrase Jo followed by the head VP did it. Declarative clauses are associated with the speech act of making a statement.

The following diagram shows the syntactic structure of the clause this is a tree. The clause has a subject noun phrase (Subj: NP) this and a head verb phrase (Head: VP). The VP has a head verb is and a predicative complement NP (PredComp: NP) a tree.

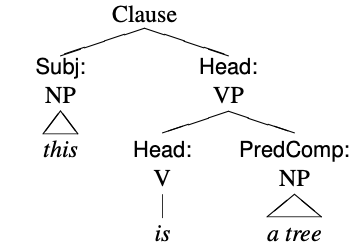

Information packaging constructions can result in the addition of other constituents and various constituent orders. For example, the it-cleft construction has it as a dummy subject, followed by a head VP containing a form of the verb be + a complement corresponding to the predicand + a relative clause whose head corresponds to the predicate. So, the example above as an it-cleft is It was Jo who did it.

===== V2 =====
Some declarative clauses follow V2 order, which is to say the first verb appears as the second constituent, even if the subject is not the first constituent. An example would be Never did I say such a thing, where never is the first constituent and did is the verb in V2 position. Addition of a tensed form of the auxiliary verb do is called do support.

==== Interrogative ====
There are two main types of independent interrogative clauses: open and closed. These are most associated with asking questions, but they can be used for other speech acts such as giving advice, making requests, etc.

Open interrogatives include an interrogative word, which, in most cases either is the subject (e.g., Who went to the shop?) or comes before an auxiliary verb + the subject. This is seen in What can you buy there? where what is the interrogative word, can is the auxiliary, and you is the subject. In such cases, the interrogative word is said to be fronted, or it may be part of a fronted constituent, as in which shop did you go to? When no auxiliary verb is present then do support is required.

The interrogative word can also appear in the non fronted position, so that the example above could be You can buy what there? where what is an object in the VP. When it is fronted, many modern theories of grammar posit a gap in the non-fronted position: What can you buy __ there? This is a kind of discontinuity.

The following diagram shows the syntactic structure of the clause What can you buy there? The clause has a fronted noun phrase (Front: NP) what, which is co-indexed to the object gap in a lower VP.

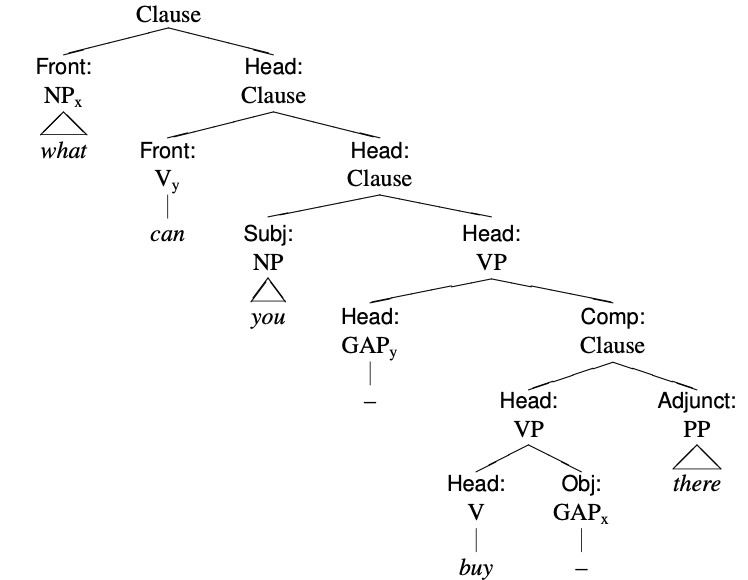

Closed interrogative clauses can be further subdivided as polar or alternative. A polar interrogative is one to which the expected response is yes or no. For example, Do you like sweets? is a polar interrogative and another case of do support. An alternative interrogative is one asking for a choice among two or more alternatives, as in Would you like coffee or tea? In both types of closed interrogatives, an auxiliary verb is fronted. That is to say, it comes before the subject. In the example above, would is the fronted auxiliary verb and you is the subject.

Another minor clause type is the interrogative tag. A tag is appended to a statement and includes only an auxiliary verb and a pronoun: you did it, didn't you?

==== Imperative ====
In most imperative clauses the subject is absent: Eat your dinner! However imperative clauses may include the subject for emphasis: You eat your dinner! In either case, the predicand is understood to be the person being addressed. There is also an imperative construction with let and the first person plural, as in let's go. An example like let them go is still understood as having a second-person predicand.

Imperatives are closely associated with the speak acts of commands and other directives.

The verb in an imperative clause is in the base form, such as eat, write, be, etc. Negative imperatives uses do-support, even if the verb is be; see § Negation below.

==== Exclamative ====
Exclamative clauses start with either the adjective what or the adverb how and are typically associated with exclamations. As with open interrogatives, the what or how phrase is fronted unless – in the case of what – it's the subject.

1. What great students you have! (subject)
2. What a nice thing you did. (object gap)
3. How kind you are. (predicative complement gap)

The following diagram shows the syntactic structure of the clause How kind you are. The clause has a fronted adjective phrase (Front: AdjP) how kind, which is co-indexed to the predicative complement gap (PredComp: gap) in the VP.

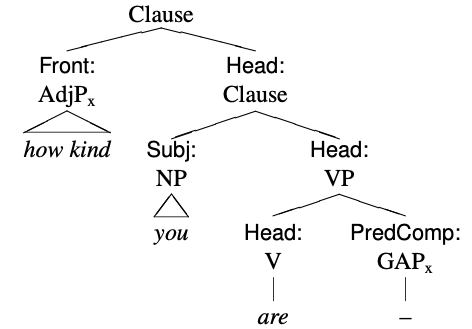

=== Dependent clause types ===
Clauses can be nested within each other, sometimes up to several levels. These clauses within clauses are said to be dependent. For example, the sentence I know the woman who says she saw your son drinking beer! contains the following dependent clauses: a non-finite clause (drinking beer) within a content clause (she saw your son drinking beer) within a relative clause (who says she saw your son drinking beer). These are all within the independent declarative clause (the whole sentence).

As the example above shows, a dependent clause may be finite (based on a finite verb, as independent clauses are), or non-finite (based on a verb in the form of an infinitive or participle). Particular types of dependent clause include relative clauses (also called "adjective clauses"), content clauses (traditionally called "noun clauses" and also known as "complement clauses") and comparative clauses, each with its own characteristic syntax.

Traditional English grammar also includes adverbial clauses, but since at least 1924, when Jespersen published The philosophy of grammar, many linguists have taken these to be prepositions with content clause complements.

==== Relative clauses ====
Syntactically, relative clauses (also called "adjective clauses") typically contain a gap (as explained above in interrogative clauses). Semantically, they contain an anaphoric relation to an element in a larger clause, typically to a noun. There are two main relative clause types: wh- relatives and non-wh- relatives, the latter of which can be further subdivided into that and bare types.

Examples of relative clause types
	Example	Type
1.	This is the house which Jack built.	wh-
2a.	This is the house that Jack built.	non wh-: that
2b.	This is the house Jack built.	non wh-: bare

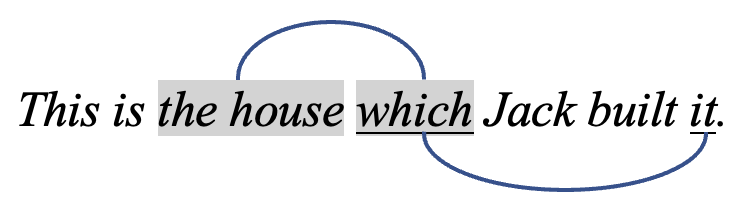
The semantic relation can be seen most easily in (1) above. This clause has a gap in the VP headed by built, where an object would usually appear. For the purposes of illustration, the gap is replaced by it in the following diagram. This shows an anaphoric relation inside the relative clause between the gap (filled by the resumptive pronoun it), and the fronted relative pronoun which. It shows a second anaphoric relation between the relative pronoun and the noun in the main clause the house. This means "this is the house" and also "Jack built the house". In a wh- relative, when the related item in the relative clause is the subject of the relative, there is no gap, so there is only the anaphoric relation between the relative pronoun and an element in the main clause (e.g., Jack, who built the house, is a good chap.)

===== Non-wh- relatives =====
Non-wh- relative clauses are of two types: that clauses and bare clauses. In most cases, either one is possible, as shown in (2) above, but when the relative item is the subject of the relative clause, there is a gap in the subject position, and bare relatives are not possible (e.g., these are the folks that __ have been helping, but not *these are the folks __ have been helping.)

Traditional grammar calls that a relative pronoun, like who above, but modern grammars consider it to be a complementizer, not a pronoun.

Non-wh- relative clauses are not typically possible with supplementary relatives. (See the main article on English relative clauses for the distinction between integrated and supplementary relatives.)

===== Wh- relatives =====
Wh- relative clauses include a relative word, a pronoun who or which, a preposition when or where, and adverb how, or an adjective, also how. This is fronted, leaving a gap, unless it is the subject or part of the subject.

==== Comparative clauses ====
Comparative clauses function chiefly as the complement in prepositional phrases headed by than or as (e.g., She is taller than I am. She's not as tall as that tree is.) Like relative clause, comparatives include a gap. Notice that be in all its forms typically requires a complement, but in a comparative clause, no complement is possible. In the case where she is 180 cm tall and I am 170 cm tall, I can't say *She's taller than I am 170cm tall, even though I am 170cm tall is a perfectly good declarative clause. Instead, there has to be a gap where the complement would usually be.

==== Content clauses ====
Like independent clauses, content clauses (also called "noun clauses" or "complement clauses") have subtypes that are associated with speech acts. There are declarative, interrogative, and exclamative content clauses. There are no dependent imperatives.

===== Declarative content clauses =====
Declarative content clauses have that and bare subtypes. Syntactically the bare types are generally identical to the independent declarative clauses. The that types differ only in that they are marked by the complementizer that (e.g., I know (that) you did it.) In most contexts either type is possible, but only the that type is possible in subject function (e.g., that it works is obvious), while most prepositions that take clausal complements allow only the bare type (I chose this because it works but not *because that it works).

===== Interrogative content clauses =====
Like the independent interrogative clauses, interrogative content clauses have open and closed types. In both types, but unlike independent interrogative clauses, the subject always precedes all verbs.

The closed types are marked with the complementizer whether or if. For example, the independent closed interrogative does it work becomes the underlined text in I wonder whether it works.

The open types begin with an interrogative word. For example, the independent open interrogative who did you meet becomes the underlined text in I wonder who you met. When the interrogative word is the subject or part of the subject, the dependent form is identical to the independent form.

=== Non-finite clauses ===
A non-finite clause is one in which the main verb is in a non-finite form, namely an infinitive, past participle, or -ing form (present participle or gerund); for how these forms are made, see English verbs. (Such a clause may also be referred to as an infinitive phrase, participial phrase, etc.)

The internal syntax of a non-finite clause is generally similar to that of a finite clause, except that there is usually no subject (and in some cases a missing complement; see below). The following types exist:

- bare infinitive clause, such as go to the party in the sentence let her go to the party.
- to-infinitive clause, such as to go to the party. Although there is no subject in such a clause, the performer of the action can (in some contexts) be expressed with a preceding prepositional phrase using for: It would be a good idea for her to go to the party. The possibility of placing adjuncts between the to and the verb in such constructions has been the subject of dispute among prescriptive grammarians; see split infinitive.
- past participial clause (active type), such as made a cake and seen to it. This is used in forming perfect constructions (see below), as in he has made a cake; I had seen to it.
- present participial clause, such as being in good health. When such a clause is used as an adjunct to a main clause, its subject is understood to be the same as that of the main clause; when this is not the case, a subject can be included in the participial clause: The king being in good health, his physician was able to take a few days' rest.
- gerund clause. This has the same form as the above, but serves as a noun rather than an adjective or adverb. The pre-appending of a subject in this case (as in I don't like you drinking, rather than the arguably more correct ...your drinking) is criticized by some prescriptive grammarians – see Fused participle.

In certain uses, a non-finite clause contains a missing (zero) item – this may be an object or complement of the verb, or the complement of a preposition within the clause (leaving the preposition "stranded"). Examples of uses of such "passive" non-finite clauses are given below:

- to-infinitive clauses – this is easy to use (zero object of use); he is the man to talk to (zero complement of preposition to).
- past participial clauses – as used in forming passive voice constructions (the cake was made, with zero object of made), and in some other uses, such as I want to get it seen to (zero complement of to). In many such cases the performer of the action can be expressed using a prepositional phrase with by, as in the cake was made by Alan.
- gerund clauses – particularly after want and need, as in Your car wants/needs cleaning (zero object of cleaning), and You want/need your head seeing to (zero complement of to).

For details of the uses of such clauses, see § Uses of non-finite constructions below. See also English passive voice (particularly under Additional passive constructions).

=== Verbless clauses ===
Verbless clauses are composed of a predicand and a verbless predicate. For example, the underlined string in [With the children so sick,] we've been at home a lot means the same thing as the clause the children are so sick. It attributes the predicate "so sick" to the predicand "the children". In most contexts, *the children so sick would be ungrammatical. Verbless clauses of this sort are common as the complement of with or without.

Other prepositions such as although, once, when, and while also take verbless clause complements, such as Although no longer a student, she still dreamed of the school, in which the predicand corresponds to the subject of the main clause, she. Supplements, too can be verbless clauses, as in Many people came, some of them children or Break over, they returned to work.

Neither A comprehensive grammar of the English language norThe Cambridge grammar of the English language offer any speculations about the structure(s) of such clauses. The latter says, without hedging, "the head of a clause (the predicate) is realised by a VP." It is not clear how such a statement could be compatible with the existence of verbless clauses.

== Constituents of a clause ==
A clause typically consists of a subject and head VP, along with any adjuncts (modifiers or supplements). The following tree diagram shows the structure of the very simple clause she arrived, which consists of a subject noun phrase and a head verb phrase (VP).

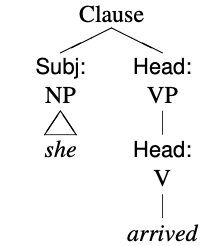

The internal structure of the VP allows a wide range of complements – most notably one or two objects – along with any adjuncts. English is an SVO language, that is, in simple declarative sentences the order of the main components is SUBJECT + HEAD-VP where the basic VP consists of HEAD-VERB + OBJECT. A clause may also have fronted constituents, such as question words or auxiliary verbs appearing before the subject.

The presence of complements depends on the pattern followed by the verb (for example, whether it is a transitive verb, i.e. one taking a direct object). A given verb may allow a number of possible patterns (for example, the verb write may be either transitive, as in He writes letters, or intransitive, as in He writes often).

Some verbs can take two objects: an indirect object and a direct object. An indirect object precedes a direct one, as in He gave the dog a bone (where the dog is the indirect object and a bone the direct object). However the indirect object may also be replaced with a prepositional phrase, usually with the preposition to or for, as in He gave a bone to the dog. (The latter method is particularly common when the direct object is a personal pronoun and the indirect object is a stronger noun phrase: He gave it to the dog would be used rather than ?He gave the dog it.)

Adjuncts are often placed after the verb and object, as in I met John yesterday. However other positions in the sentence are also possible. Another adverb which is subject to special rules is the negating word not; see § Negation below.

Objects normally precede other complements in the VP, as in I told him to fetch it (where him is the object, and the infinitive phrase to fetch it is a further complement). Other possible complements include prepositional phrases, such as for Jim in the clause They waited for Jim or before you did in the clause I arrived before you did; predicative expressions, such as red in The ball is red; or content or non-finite clauses.

Many English verbs are used together with a particle (such as in or away) and with preposition phrases in constructions that are commonly referred to as "phrasal verbs". These complements often modify the meaning of the verb in an unpredictable way, and a verb-particle combination such as give up can be considered a single lexical item. The position of such particles in the clause is subject to different rules from other adverbs; for details see Phrasal verb.

English is not a "pro-drop" (specifically, null-subject) language – that is, unlike some languages, English requires that the subject of a clause always be expressed explicitly, even if it can be deduced from the form of the verb and the context, and even if it has no meaningful referent, as in the sentence It is raining, where the subject it is a dummy pronoun. Imperative and non-finite clauses are exceptions, in that they usually do not have a subject expressed.

== Variations on SVO pattern ==
Variations on the basic SVO pattern occur in certain types of clause. The subject is absent in most imperative clauses and most non-finite clauses (see the § Non-finite clauses sections). For cases in which the verb or a verb complement is omitted, see § Elliptical clauses.

The verb and subject are inverted in most interrogative clauses. This requires that the verb be an auxiliary (and do-support is used to provide an auxiliary if there is otherwise no invertible verb). This is exemplified in the following tree diagram, which shows a fronted NP who co-indexed to a gap lower down in the clause. It also shows that auxiliary verb did in front of the subject NP you, instead of the usual subject–verb order.

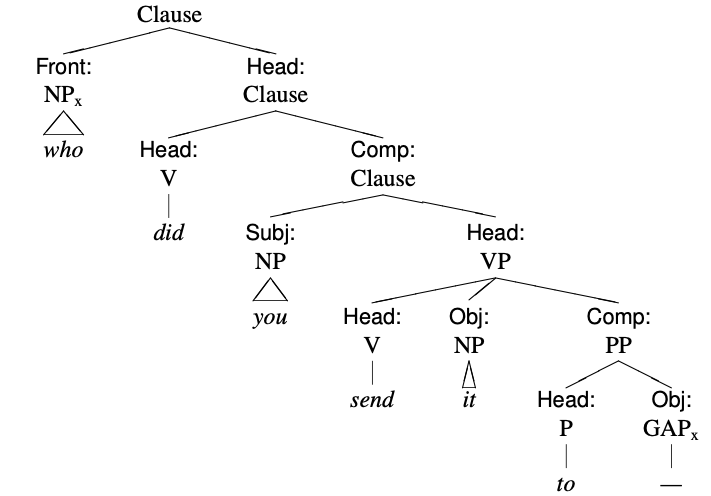

The same type of inversion occurs in certain other types of clause, particularly main clauses beginning with an adjunct having negative force (Never have I witnessed such carnage), and some dependent clauses expressing a condition (Should you decide to come,...). For details see subject–auxiliary inversion and negative inversion.

A somewhat different type of inversion may involve a wider set of verbs (as in After the sun comes the rain); see subject–verb inversion.

In certain types of clause an object or other complement becomes zero or is brought to the front of the clause: see § Fronting and zeroing.

=== Fronting and zeroing ===
In interrogative and relative clauses, wh-fronting occurs; that is, the interrogative word or relative pronoun (or in some cases a phrase containing it) is brought to the front of the clause: What did you see? (the interrogative word what comes first even though it is the object); The man to whom you gave the book... (the phrase to whom, containing the relative pronoun, comes to the front of the relative clause; for more detail on relative clauses see English relative clauses).

Fronting of various elements can also occur for reasons of focus; occasionally even an object or other verbal complement can be fronted rather than appear in its usual position after the verb, as in I met Tom yesterday, but Jane I haven't seen for ages. (For cases in which fronting is accompanied by inversion of subject and verb, see negative inversion and subject–verb inversion.)

In certain types of non-finite clause ("passive" types; see non-finite clauses above), and in some relative clauses, an object or a preposition complement is absent (becomes zero). For example, in I like the cake you made, the words you made form a reduced relative clause in which the verb made has zero object. This can produce preposition stranding (as can wh-fronting): I like the song you were listening to; Which chair did you sit on?

=== Elliptical clauses ===
Certain clauses display ellipsis, where some component is omitted, usually by way of avoidance of repetition. Examples include:

- omitted verb between subject and complement, as in You love me, and I you (where the same verb love is understood between I' and you).
- tag questions, as in He can't speak French, can he? (where the infinitive clause speak French is understood to be the dependent of can).
- similar short sentences or clauses such as I can, there is, we will, etc., where the omitted non-finite clause or other complement is understood from what has gone before (for examples involving inversion, such as so/neither do I, see subject–auxiliary inversion).

For more analysis and further examples, see Verb phrase ellipsis.

== Functions of clauses ==
=== Independent clauses ===
Independent clauses generally have no functional relationship to larger syntactic units. The main exception is in a coordination of clauses, where they can be coordinates or heads of a marked clause. An example would be I came, and I went, which is shown in the following syntax tree. Neither coordinate is the head of the coordination; a coordination is a non-headed construction. The first clause, I came is unmarked, and cannot be marked. The second is marked with the coordinator and, so that the clause I went functions as the head of the marked clause and I went.

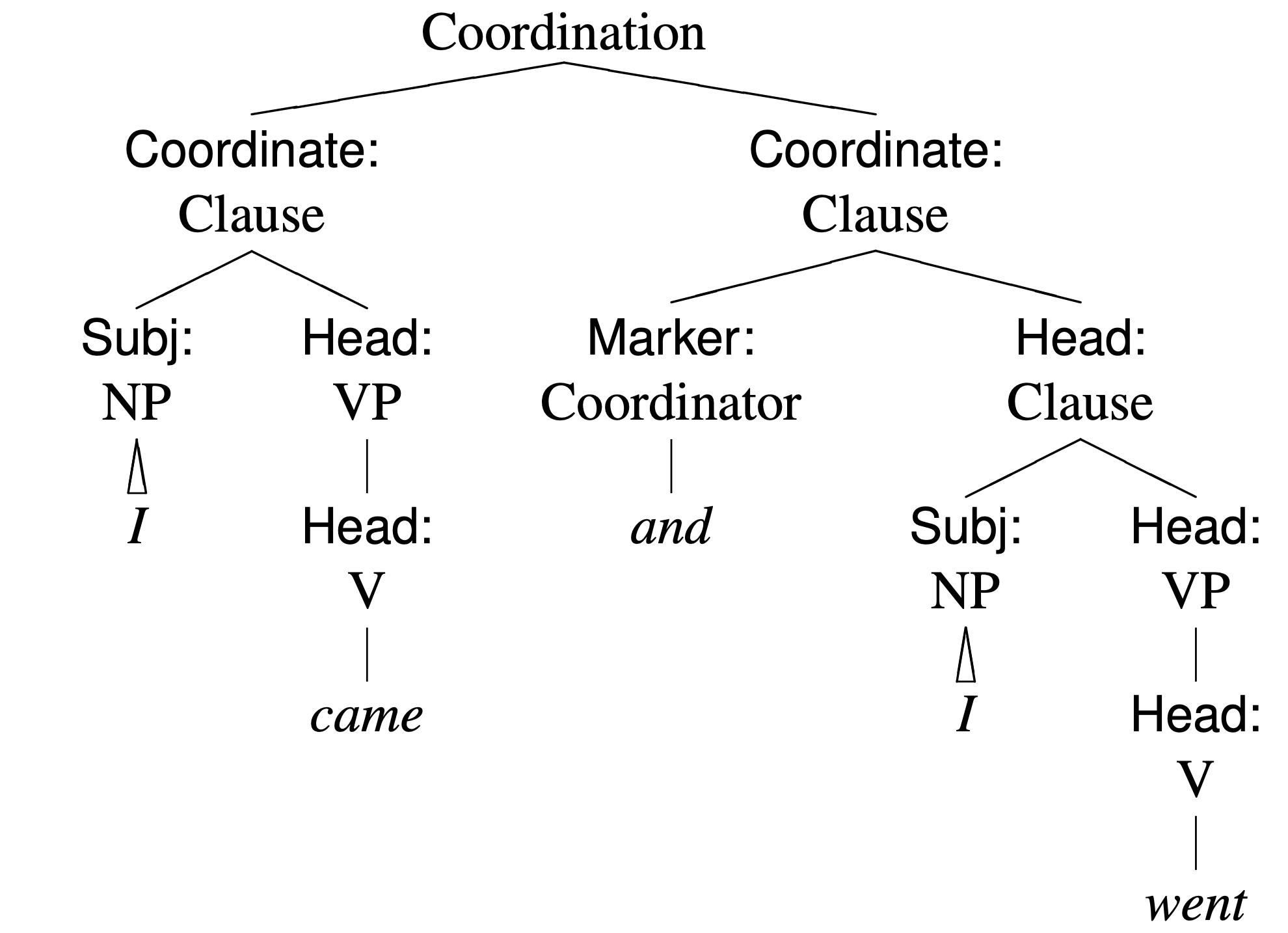

The example above uses declarative clauses, but the same holds for interrogative, exclamative, and imperative clauses.

=== Dependent clauses ===
Dependent clauses are much more various in their functions. They typically function as dependents, but they can also function as heads, despite their names, and the list of possible functions depends on the clause type.

==== Complement in a verb phrase ====
Traditional grammar takes clauses like the underlined part of heard she went there as noun clauses, under the ideas that they "function as nouns". But these can appear where semantically related noun phrases are not possible: We decided that we would meet, but not *We decided a meeting.

The most typical dependent clause function is complement in a verb phrase (VP). Different verbs license different clause types as complements. For example, the verb wonder licenses interrogative content clauses but not declarative content clauses (e.g., I wonder whether it will work or not. but not *I wonder that it will work.) Similarly, like licenses that declarative content clauses, exclamatives, to infinitivals and present participials: I like that it looks good; I like what a great look that is; I like to think so; I like being here. But enjoy, with a very similar meaning, does not license to infinitival clauses (e.g., *I enjoy to think so.), and a declarative content clauses complement is marginal ^{?}I enjoy that it works.

==== Complement in a preposition phrase ====
Traditional grammar takes constructions like before she went there to be adverbial clauses, but since Jespersen (1924), many modern grammars take them to be prepositional phrases with clausal complements. Prepositions that take clausal complements include although, before, if, when, and many others (See List of English prepositions § Conjunctive Prepositions).

Most such prepositions allow only bare declarative content clauses (e.g., before she went there), but others are sometimes possible. For example, about whether they are true.

===== Comparative clauses in a prepositional phrase =====
Comparative clauses are almost entirely limited to functioning as the complement of the prepositions than or as.

==== Complement in a noun phrase ====
Some nouns license content clause complements, as in the idea that it might work. Typically, these nouns denote thought (e.g., idea, decision, guess, etc.) or language (e.g., claim, statement, etc.). With some nouns, to infinitival clauses are also possible (e.g., the decision to go).

==== Complement in an adjective phrase ====
Quite a few adjectives also license content clause complements, as in happy that you made it. again, these adjectives tend to be semantically related to thoughts and feelings (e.g., happy, excited, disappointed, etc.).

==== Subject in a clause ====
Most subordinate clause types can function as subject in a clause. The main exceptions are relative clauses, comparative clauses, and bare declarative clauses.

==== Modifier in a noun phrase ====
The most common function of relative clauses is modifier in a noun phrase, as in the house that Jack built.

==== Supplement in a clause or verb phrase ====
Most subordinate clause types can function as a supplement in a clause or verb phrase, comparative clauses being the main exception.

==== Head in a larger clause of the same type ====
When a subordinate clause has a marker, such as a coordinator (and, or, but, etc.) or complementizer (that, whether, if, etc.), it is headed by a clause of the same type. This is shown in the following syntax tree.

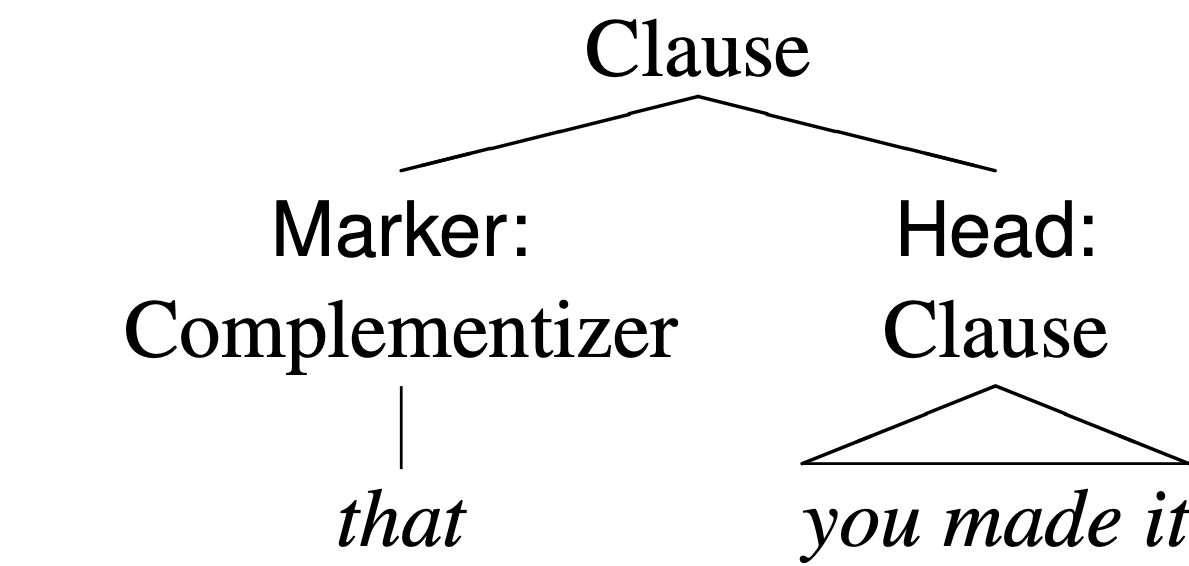

== Negation ==
A clause is negated by the inclusion of the word not:

- In a finite indicative clause in which the finite verb is an auxiliary or copula, the word not comes after that verb, often forming a contraction in n't: He will not (won't) win.
- In a finite indicative clause in which there is otherwise no auxiliary or copula, do-support is used to provide one: He does not (doesn't) want to win.
- In the above clause types, if there is inversion (for example, because the sentence is interrogative), the subject may come after the verb and before not, or after the contraction in n't: Do you not (Don't you) want to win? In the case of inversion expressing a condition, the contracted form is not possible: Should you not (not: *Shouldn't you) wish to attend...
- Negative imperatives are formed with do-support, even in the case of the copula: Don't be silly!
- The negative of the present subjunctive is made by placing not before the verb: ...that you not meet us; ...that he not be punished. The past subjunctive were is negated like the indicative (were not, weren't).
- A non-finite clause is negated by placing not before the verb form: not to be outdone (sometimes not is placed after to in such clauses, though often frowned upon as a split infinitive), not knowing what to do.

== See also ==
- English grammar
- English verb tenses
- English auxiliary verbs
- English passive voice
- English subjunctive
