= English prepositions =

Prepositions in the English language

English prepositions are words – such as of, in, on, at, from, etc. – that function as the head of a prepositional phrase, and most characteristically license a noun phrase object (e.g., in the water). Semantically, they most typically denote relations in space and time. Morphologically, they are usually simple and do not inflect. They form a closed lexical category.

Many of the most common of these are grammaticalized and correspond to case markings in languages such as Latin. For example, of typically corresponds to the genitive.

== History of the concept in English ==
The history of the idea of prepositions in

English grammar writing can be seen as one of relative stagnation, only exceptionally interrupted by certain more influential authors... It was only in the second half of the twentieth century that the situation radically changed and since then, grammarians have introduced scientifically precise definitions and developed detailed and elaborate frameworks for their description.

The word preposition is from "Latin praepositionem (nominative praepositio) 'a putting before, a prefixing,' noun of action from past-participle stem of praeponere 'put before'," the basic idea being that it is a word that comes before a noun. Its first known use in English is by John Drury, writing in Middle English on Latin grammar c. 1434.

With what case xal þe comparatif degre be construid with {be cause} of his degre? With an ablatif case of eyþer nownbre {with oute} a preposicion.
With what case shall the comparative degree be construed with because of its degree? With an ablative case of either number without a preposition.
"What case should the comparative degree be construed with because of its degree? With an ablative case of either number without a preposition."

The meaning was essentially the same as the general idea today: a simple word preceding a noun expressing a relation between it and another word.

William Bullokar wrote the earliest grammar of English, published in 1586. It includes a chapter on prepositions. His definition follows:

A part of speech properly used prepositively, that is governing an accusative case set next after it (except sometime in verse it is set after his casual word) as, I go to the church: and is sometime postpositively used, that is, when it governeth the relative, that, or which, coming before a verb, whose governing preposition is set after such verb: as, this is the man whom we spoke of, or of whom we spoke; and is some time used in composition after a verb, but being severed from the verb by the adverb, not, or by an accusative case, may be said to be set in apposition adverbially. (p. 320; orthography has been modernized)

Some grammarians, though, noted problems. In 1746, John Kirkby complains: "we have several instances of the same word being used at one time as a conjunction and at another time as a preposition." And in 1784, John Hunter

argued in much more detail, in a paper presented to the Royal Society of Edinburgh in its first year, that neither conjunctions nor adverbs were in all cases usefully distinguished from prepositions in English (or in Latin and Greek). He stressed that classifications were being based on the "merely accidental" differences in what constituent (if any) happened to follow the word. The rational analysis is to treat after as simply a preposition governing (optionally) a complement that can be either a noun phrase or a clause.

In 1924, Otto Jespersen developed these ideas, pointing out that prepositions were the only lexical category defined by the type of complement. In other words, prepositions were defined as words that take a noun phrase (NP) complement. Verbs, though, take various complements, including object, goal complement, predicative complement, and no complement at all, in the case of an intransitive verb. Similarly, an adjective phrase may consist of an adjective alone or with a complement (e.g., I'm happy; I'm happy to be here). Jespersen also noted that many words, such as before in I came before, which were categorized as adverbs, were very similar in meaning and syntax to prepositions (e.g., I came before you.). And the same held for many words categorized as subordinating conjunctions (e.g., I came before you did.). He therefore proposed that all these words are prepositions, and that the requirement that they be followed by a noun phrase be dropped. This is the position taken in many modern grammars, such as The Cambridge Grammar of the English Language. On the other hand, dictionaries and ESL grammars have not adopted these ideas. For example, Merriam-Webster's Dictionary has before as an adverb, preposition, and conjunction.

== Preposition vs other lexical categories ==
=== Prepositions vs verbs ===
Both prepositions and verbs license NP objects, but in most cases, the distinction is clear because verbs conjugate, and prepositions do not. There are, however, a number of prepositions derived from participial verb forms (e.g., come or barring), which could be confused with verbs. Modification by really is typically possible with a VP (e.g., spring has really come) but not with a PP (e.g., the *flowers will bloom really come spring (Note: This article uses asterisks to indicate ungrammatical examples.)).

=== Intransitive prepositions vs adverbs ===
One of the results of the reconceptualization of prepositions by Jespersen and others (see § History of the concept in English) is confusion between intransitive prepositions and adverbs. Many adverbs end in -ly, which clearly distinguishes them from prepositions, but many do not. One simple test that is often telling is to modify the phrase by right or just. In Standard English, adverb phrases do not accept such modification (e.g., it ran right up the tree [PP]; *it ran right vertically [AdvP].) Also, PPs commonly function as complements in a be VP (e.g., it is in the car), while adverbs cannot normally do so.

=== Prepositions vs complementizers ===
"Complementizer" is a term which has its origins in generative grammar. It refers to a restricted subset of what are classified as subordinating conjunctions in traditional grammar. There are only a very few complementizers: that, whether, and if are the main examples.

Traditional grammar includes words like because, while, and unless in the class of subordinating conjunctions. But since at least Jespersen (see § History of the concept in English) most modern grammarians distinguish these two categories based on whether they add meaning to the sentence or are purely functional. The distinction can be shown with if, since there is a complementizer if and a preposition if. The preposition introduces a conditional meaning (e.g., if it works, that's great). Complementizers, though, have no meaning. They just mark a clause as subordinate; there is no difference in meaning between I know that you were there and I know you were there. Similarly, in She asked if we were there the complementizer if merely marks the following clause as a closed interrogative content clause, without adding any conditional meaning.

== The syntax of prepositions and PPs ==
=== Internal structure ===
PPs are usually quite simple in their internal structure. The following syntax tree shows a PP with an adverb phrase as modifier and a head PP. The head PP has a head preposition in and an object NP the rain.

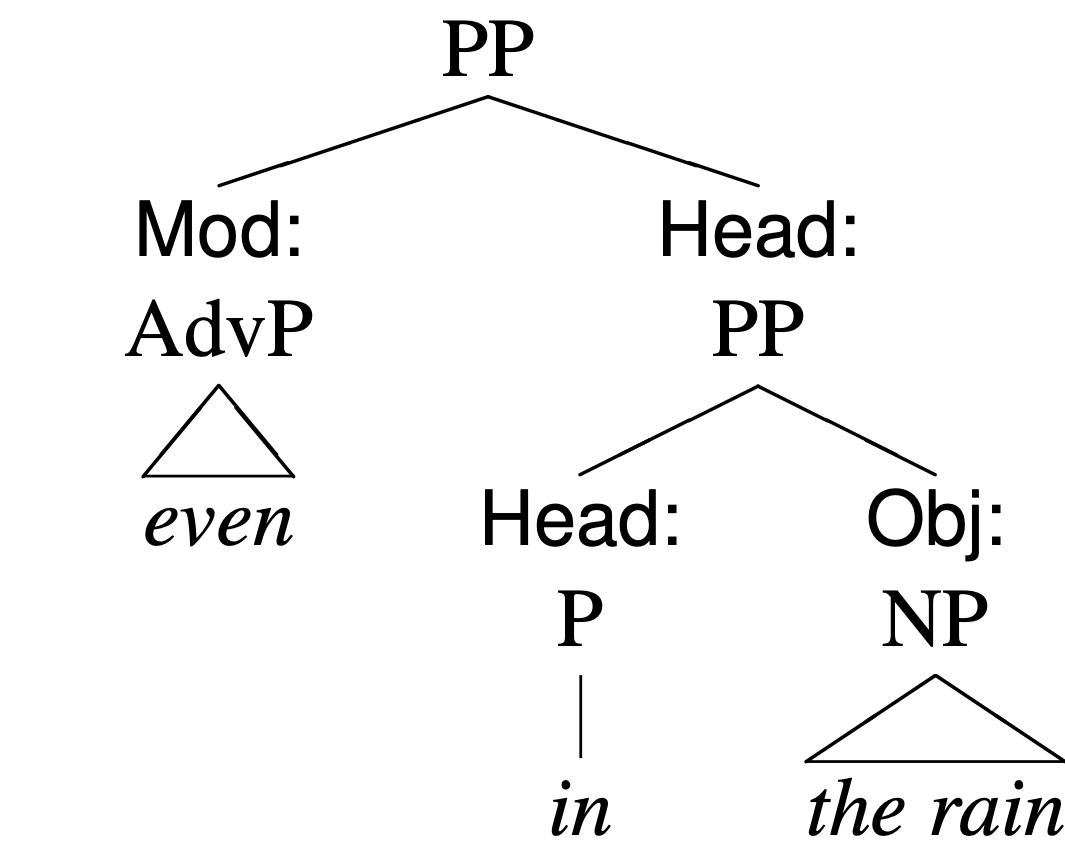

When the preposition governs an argument of a larger phrase, such as a noun phrase, the object of the preposition is sometimes called a prepositional or oblique argument. For example, convert the energy of ocean waves into electricity becomes the conversion [of the energy of ocean waves] into electricity, where the underlined NP – which is the object in the PP headed by of – is the oblique argument of conversion.

==== Postpositions ====
A very small number of prepositions (see List of English prepositions § Postpositions) may occur after their object, for example, notwithstanding, which can appear either before the object (e.g., notwithstanding the fact) or after (e.g., the contrary notwithstanding).

=== Complements of prepositions ===
Traditional grammars of English characterize prepositions as words that take objects in the form of noun phrases. Though the prototypical prepositional phrase consists of a noun phrase complement following a preposition, prepositions can take a wider variety of complements than just noun phrases. English prepositions can also take clauses, adjective phrases, adverb phrases, and other prepositional phrases as complements, though they occur less frequently than noun phrase complements.

==== Noun phrase complements ====
Prepositions typically take noun phrases as complements. For example, the prepositional phrase on the table consists of the head on and the complement the table, and the prepositional phrase in the area consists of the head in and the complement the area. By analogy with noun phrase complements of verbs, noun phrase complements of prepositions are occasionally called objects in grammars of English.

Like objects of verbs, objects of preposition typically carry accusative case. Thus, we expect to see prepositional phrases like near me and at her rather than near I and at she because me and her are accusative case pronouns while I and she are nominative case pronouns. Indeed, some grammars treat the inability of prepositions to have nominative case pronouns as a defining characteristic of prepositions. An exception to this rule about case seems to occur when the preposition takes a coordinated pair of objects, such as someone and I. In these cases, usage varies, and the pronoun can carry either nominative or accusative case. For example, users of English might say "between you and I" or "between you and me". Some commentators have called the former "illiterate" and a sign that the English language is deteriorating, according to Merriam-Webster's Dictionary of English Usage, nominative case pronouns as part of a coordinated pair of prepositional objects have occurred in respected works of literature and are actually more characteristic of educated varieties of English than of less educated varieties.

In some cases, the object NP in the PP is atypical in that it lacks a determiner. For example, I'm in school is grammatical, even though an NP headed by the singular noun school usually requires a determiner; *They're building new school is not grammatical because it is lacking a determiner. Other examples are in hospital (in British English) and to bed. Typically the meaning here implies a purpose. For example, going to the bed does not suggest sleeping in the way that going to bed does.

==== Clause complements ====
Prepositions that take a clause as a complement are called conjunctive prepositions or subordinating prepositions. Conjunctive prepositions can take a variety of kinds of clauses as complements. Most often, they take finite clauses as complements. These finite clause complements can be declarative (this happened after Stacy left) or interrogative (they ignored the question of whether it was ethical). They can also be subjunctive clauses (lest there be any doubt).

Less commonly, conjunctive prepositions take non-finite clauses as complements. These non-finite clause complements include infinitive clauses (we can't agree on how much to charge) and present participle clauses (you can't just put it on without them knowing). These clauses may occur with or without subjects, and subjects that do occur can be in accusative case (without them knowing) or genitive case (without their knowing). Though various usage commentators have called both cases incorrect in such clauses, many writers use both constructions, and the choice of case often depends on the context. For example, the accusative case is more likely when the subject is emphasized, a phrase intervenes between the subject and the verb, or the subject is plural.

==== Other complements of prepositions ====
In more limited cases, prepositions can take other kinds of complements. The preposition as can take an adjective phrase complement to form a prepositional phrase that functions as an object complement (you described them as jealous). Prepositions also take adjective phrase complements in certain fixed phrases, such as at last and in brief.

As with adjective phrase complements, prepositions can take adverb phrase complements in fixed phrases, such as by far and since when. Further, certain prepositions (namely, before/ere, for, and till/until) can take temporal adverbs (such as later, long, one, and recently) as complements, forming prepositional phrases such as for later, until recently, for once, and before long.

Prepositions can also take prepositional phrases as complements. These prepositional phrase complements can be specified by the preposition or not. In the prepositional phrase apart from Jill, for example, the preposition apart requires that the complement include the preposition from. In the prepositional phrase since before the war, however, the preposition since does not require the preposition before and could have instead been something else, such as since after the war.

=== Modifiers of prepositions ===
Prepositions may optionally be modified by other phrasal categories. Adverb phrases, noun phrases, and prepositional phrases can function as pre-head modifiers of prepositions (that is, modify prepositions that follow them), and prepositional phases can also function as post-head modifiers (that is, modify prepositions that precede them).

==== Pre-head modifiers ====
Adverb phrases can function as pre-head modifiers in prepositional phrases. For example, the prepositional phrase after midnight can be modified by adverb phrases such as shortly (shortly after midnight) or quite obviously (quite obviously after midnight). A subset of adverb phrase modifiers of prepositions express degree and occur within prepositional phrases but not other phrasal categories. These degree adverbs include clear, flat, plumb, right, smack, and straight. Examples of prepositional phrases modified in this way include clear up the tree, straight out the door, and right out of the park.

Noun phrases indicating spatial or temporal extent can occur before a preposition that expresses spatial or temporal meaning in order to modify it. For example, the prepositional phrase beyond the post office can be modified by the noun phrase two miles (two miles beyond the post office) or a few minutes' walk (a few minutes' walk beyond the post office).

Certain prepositions with directional meanings can function as pre-head modifiers in prepositional phrases. The prepositions down, out, over, and up frequently occur in this role. For example, the preposition down can modify the prepositional phrases by the beach (down by the beach) and by the sea (down by the sea). We can tell that these directional prepositions are modifying other proportional phrases rather than taking prepositional phrases as complements because the other preposition determines whether the whole phrase is grammatical. Thus, "I placed it up on the shelf" is grammatical because "I placed it on the shelf" is also grammatical, but "I placed it up to the attic" is not grammatical because "I placed it to the attic" is not grammatical.

==== Post-head modifiers ====
Prepositional phrases can also modify prepositions that precede them. In the clause they go out in the cold, for example, the preposition out is modified by the prepositional phrase in the cold. Though it may appear that in the cold could be modifying the verb go rather than the preposition out, movement of the elements to different parts of the clause suggests that in the cold is actually linked with the preposition out: the prepositional phrase in the cold cannot move to the start of the clause by itself (*in the cold they go out) but it can move to the start of the clause as part of the larger prepositional phrase out in the cold (out in the cold they go).

=== Functions ===
PPs typically function as adjuncts in clauses, verb phrases, NPs, and AdjPs. They also function as complements in VPs, PPs, AdjPs, and NPs.

==== Particle ====
Prepositions may function as particles, a kind of dependent in a VP that may, unusually, come between a verb and an object. An example is up in pick up the children or pick the children up.

==== Subject ====
In rare cases, a PP can function as the subject of a clause, such as the underlined PP in the following conversation:

A: What time can we meet?

B: Before noon doesn't work.

== Types of prepositions ==
=== Subcategorization ===
In linguistics, subcategorization is the "assignment of a lexical item to a subclass of its part of speech, especially with respect to the syntactic elements with which it can combine." Prepositions can be subcategorized based on complement type. The list of English prepositions is categorized this way.

Though the prototypical preposition is a single word that precedes a noun phrase complement and expresses spatial relations, the category of preposition includes more than this limited notion (see English prepositions § History of the concept in English). Prepositions can be categorized according to whether the preposition takes a complement, what kind of complement the preposition takes, on what side of the preposition the complement occurs, and whether the preposition consists of one word or multiple words.

A preposition that takes a noun-phrase complement is called a transitive preposition (e.g., She went up the hill), and one that does not take any complements an intransitive preposition (e.g., She went up). Prepositions can also take the following types of complements: clauses (e.g., after you arrived), adjective phrases (e.g., accepted as valid), and other prepositional phrases (e.g., because of the problem).

A preposition whose complement precedes it (e.g., the constitution notwithstanding) may be called a postposition to distinguish it from more prototypical prepositions, whose complements follow them. Some grammars classify prepositions and postpositions as different kinds of adpositions while other grammars categorize both under the heading of the more common variety in the language. Thus, in the latter categorization method, postpositions may be considered a variety of preposition in English.

=== Complex prepositions ===
A complex preposition is a multi-word preposition. The Cambridge Grammar of the English Language (CGEL) says of complex prepositions,

In the first place, there is a good deal of inconsistency in the traditional account, as reflected in the practice of dictionaries, as to which combinations are analysed as complex prepositions and which as sequences of adverb + preposition. For example, owing to and out of are listed as prepositions, but according to, because of, and instead of are treated as adverb + preposition. Modern descriptive grammars have tended to extend the category of complex prepositions, and there is accordingly some variation in dictionary practice, depending on how far they are influenced by such work.

CGEL generally argues against a complex preposition analysis, and favours a "layered head analysis" for expressions like in front of the car. In this analysis, in front is a PP, which is head of a larger PP that has of the car as a complement.

== Fronting and stranding ==
Preposition fronting (see English clause syntax § Fronting and zeroing) and stranding can occur when the complement of the PP is an interrogative or relative pronoun, as in the following examples with the relative or interrogative words underlined and the prepositions in bold.

Examples of preposition fronting and stranding
	In place	Fronting	Stranding
Int	You went **with** who?	**With** whom did you go?	Who did you go **with**?
Int	N/A	I wonder **to** which it applies.	I wonder which it applies **to**.
Rel	N/A	This is the table **on** which she placed it.	This is the table which she placed it **on**.

=== Fronting ===
Preposition fronting is a feature of very formal registers and rare in casual registers. Not just the interrogative phrase but the PP containing it is fronted. In the example above, the PP with whom is not in its usual position inside the VP after the head verb. Instead, it appears at the front of the clause. When the pronoun is who the accusative whom form is typically used.

=== Stranding ===
In preposition stranding, the relative or interrogative phrase appears at the front of the clause instead of in its usual position inside the P after the head preposition. The preposition is then "stranded", typically at the end of the clause. Merriam-Webster stated on Twitter in July 2020 and on Instagram in February 2024 that it was acceptable, after centuries of people saying this should not happen.

== Semantics ==
=== Space and time ===
Prepositions most typically denote relations in space and time.

==== Location ====
Prepositions like in and at typically denote locations in space (e.g., I live in Toronto) and time (e.g., I arrived in January). These prepositions often locate something relative to the object (e.g., the speaker relative to Toronto).

==== Goal and source ====
Prepositions like to and from typically denote the beginning or end point of a path in space (e.g., I went from Ottawa to Toronto) and time (e.g., I lived there from 1992 to 2003).

==== Path ====
Prepositions like through and over typically denote the course of a path in space (e.g., I went over the hill) and time (e.g., I lived there through the 1990s).

=== Other ===
The semantic classification of prepositions has no principled limit. But a small sample of the variation can be presented. Because and since are connected to reasons. Concerning and regarding are related to topicality, with and without to having. The prepositions plus, minus, and times are related to mathematical operations. Than and as signify comparison. And so forth.

== Morphology ==
Given that English prepositions hardly ever inflect, discussion of their morphology is generally limited to word formation. English prepositions are formed through both derivation and compounding, and some carry inflectional morphology associated with other parts of speech.

=== Derivational morphology ===
Most prepositions are simple bases consisting of a single morpheme, like in, from, and under. Historically, however, English prepositions have been formed from the prefixes a- and be-. This a- prefix originally contributed the meaning "on" or "onto" but is no longer productive; that is, it is no longer used to form new words. The preposition aboard, for example, can be paraphrased as "on board of". The be- prefix originally meant "about" but, in prepositions, came to mean something closer to "at" or "near". For example, one sense of the preposition before means "at or near the front". Though the be- prefix is still productive in forming words of certain parts of speech, it is no longer used to form new prepositions.

Some morphological bases of prepositions remain productive. For example, -ward, which occurs in prepositions such as afterward and toward, can attach to other morphemes to form new prepositions such as sun in we looked sunward.

=== Inflectional morphology ===
Despite lacking an inflectional system of their own, English prepositions occasionally carry inflectional morphemes associated with other parts of speech, namely verbs and adjectives. For example, some English prepositions derive from non-finite verb forms and still carry the associated inflectional affixes. The prepositions barring and concerning, for example, contain the -ing suffix of present participle verb forms. Similarly, the prepositions given and granted contain, respectively, the -en and -ed suffixes of past participle verb forms.

The prepositions near and far are unusual in that they seem to inflect for comparison, a feature typically limited to adjectives and adverbs in English.

=== Compound prepositions ===
A compound preposition is a single word composed of more than one base. Often, the bases of compound prepositions are both prepositions. Compound prepositions of this kind include into, onto, throughout, upon, within, and without. Compound prepositions have also been formed from prepositions and nouns. Compound prepositions of this kind include some transitive prepositions, such as alongside, inside, and outside, but they are typically intransitive, such as downhill, downstage, downstairs, and downstream.

== Phonology ==
Harold Palmer noted in 1924, that when a preposition is the last element in a clause or intonation group, it is in its "strong form" or stressed and when it comes before, it is in its "weak form" or unstressed. For example, I'm from Toronto is unstressed as /ˈfrəm/, while Where are you from is stressed as /ˈfrʌm/ or /ˈfrɒm/. This observation is originally due to Henry M. Sweet.
