= William Bullokar =

English printer

William Bullokar (c. 1531 - 4 March 1609) was a 16th-century English phonetician and printer who devised a 40-letter phonetic alphabet for the English language. His 1586 work Bref Grammar of English was the first printed grammar of the English language.

== Early life ==
Bullokar lived in London for the beginning of his life. At around 1550, he began to teach, and noticed that the particular spellings of words would cause disagreement amongst teachers and students. He decided that 24 letters were not sufficient to capture the English language, and devised instead an alphabet of 40 letters.

== Bullokar's alphabet ==
Bullokar's alphabet's characters were presented in the black-letter or "gothic" writing style commonly used at the time and also in Roman type. Taking as his model a Latin grammar by William Lily, Bullokar wrote the first published grammar of the English language, in a book titled Bref Grammar of English, which appeared in 1586.

In his 1575 pamphlet, button was spelled butn.

The letters of Bullokar's alphabet as published in 1580

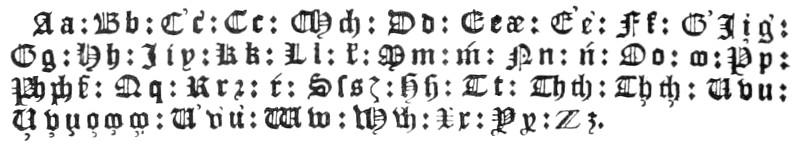
William Bullokar's alphabet with upper and lower-case letters as published in 1580

== Works ==
- Bullokar, William (1580). A short Introduction or guiding to print, write, and reade Inglish speech. London: Henrie Denham.
  - scan: A short Introduction or guiding to print, write, and reade Inglish speech at the Internet Archive
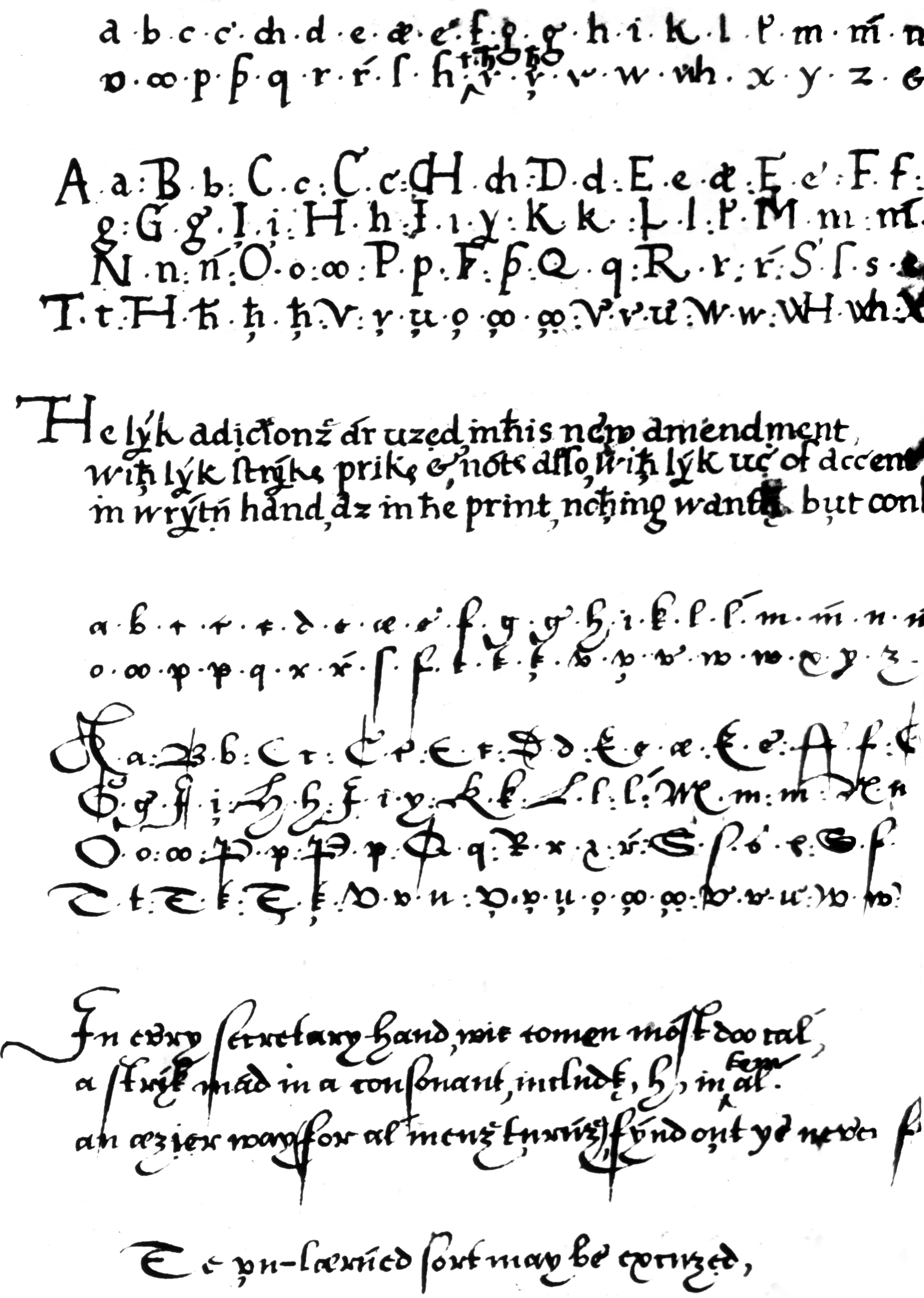
- A sample of Bullokar's alphabet handwritten
  Bullokar, William (1580). Booke at large, for the Amendment of Orthographie for English Speech. London: Henrie Denham.
  - facsimile edition: Bullokar, William (1968). The Amendment of Orthographie for English Speech. Amsterdam: Theatrum Orbis Terrarum Ltd.
  - facsimile in Bullokar (1977)
  - transcription at Plessow (1906), pp. 237-330
- Bullokar, William (1584). Æsops Fábĺz. London: Edmund Bollifant.
  - transcription at Plessow (1906), pp. 1-212
- Bullokar, William (n.d.) [1585]. The short Sentences of the wýʒ Cato. London: Edmund Bollifant.
  - transcription at Plessow (1906), pp. 213-235
- Bullokar, William (1586). Bref Grammar for English. London: Edmund Bollifant.
  - facsimile in Bullokar (1977)
  - transcription at Plessow (1906), pp. 331-385
- Bullokar, William (1586). Pamphlet for Grammar. London: Edmund Bollifant.
  - transcription at Plessow (1906), pp. 386-390

== See also ==
- History of English grammars
- English-language spelling reform

== Bibliography ==
- Bullokar, William (1977). Booke at Large for the Amendment of English Orthographie (1580) with A Bref Grammar for English (1586). Scholars' Facsimiles & Reprints. ISBN 978-0-8201-1287-9.
- Plessow, Max (1906). Geschichte der Fabeldichtung in England bis zu John Gay (1726): Nebst Neudruck von Bullokars "Fables of Æsop" 1585, "Booke at Large" 1580, "Bref Grammar for English" 1586, und "Pamphlet for Grammar" 1586. Berlin: Mayer & Müller.
