= List of English prepositions =

List of every preposition from each category

This is a list of English prepositions.

== Prototypical prepositions ==
The following are single-word prepositions that can take a noun phrase complement following the preposition. Prepositions in this section may also take other kinds of complements in addition to noun phrase complements. Prepositions marked with an asterisk can be used transitively or intransitively; that is, they can take noun phrase complements (e.g., he was in the house) or not (e.g., he was in).

- a
- aboard*
- about*
  - abt. (written abbreviation)
- above*
- abreast
- absent
- across*
- after*
- against*
- aloft*
- along*
- alongside*
- amid
  - amidst
  - mid
  - midst
- among
  - amongst
- anti
- apropos*
- around*
  - round*
- as
- aslant
- astride
- at
  - @ (written alternative)
- atop
  - ontop (nonstandard)
- bar
- barring
- before*
  - B4 (written abbreviation)
- behind*
- below*
- beneath*
  - neath
- beside
- besides*
- between*
  - 'tween
- beyond*
- but
- by*
- chez
- circa
  - c., ca. (abbreviations)
- come
- concerning
- contra
- counting
- cum
- despite
  - spite (abbreviation)
- down*
- during
- effective
- ere
- except
- excepting
- excluding
- failing
- following
- for
- from
- in*
- including
- inside*
- into
- less
- like
- minus
- modulo
  - mod (abbreviation)
- near*
  - nearer (comparative)
  - nearest (superlative)
- next
- notwithstanding* (also postpositional)
- of
  - o' (written alternative; informal)
- off*
- offshore
- on*
- onto
- opposite
- out
- outside*
- over*
  - o'er
- pace
- past*
- pending
- per
- plus
- post
- pre
- pro
- qua
- re
- regarding
- respecting
- sans
- save
- saving
- short
- since*
- sub
- than
- through*
  - thru (informal)
- throughout*
  - thruout (simplified spelling)
- till
- times
- to*
  - t' (abbreviation)
  - 2 (abbreviation)
- touching (archaic)
- toward, towards
- under*
- underneath*
- unlike
- until
- unto (poetic)
- up*
- upon
- versus
  - vs., v. (abbreviations)
- via
- vice (formal)
- vis-à-vis (formal)
- wanting
- with
  - w/, w. (abbreviation)
  - c̄ (abbreviation in prescriptions)
- within*
  - w/i (abbreviation)
- without*
  - 'thout
  - w/o (abbreviation)
- worth

== Intransitive prepositions ==
The following are single-word intransitive prepositions. This portion of the list includes only prepositions that are always intransitive; prepositions that can occur with or without noun phrase complements (that is, transitively or intransitively) are listed with the prototypical prepositions. Note that dictionaries and grammars informed by concepts from traditional grammar may categorize these intransitive prepositions as adverbs.

- abroad (Note: Abroad can also be used transitively in a rare sense of the term: "We scatter abroad the face of the earth.")
- adrift
- aft
- afterward(s)
- ahead (Note: Ahead can also be used transitively in a rare sense of the term: "I saw the figure of my friend ahead me.")
- apart
- ashore
- aside (Note: Aside can also be used transitively in certain regional varieties: "The boys were often seated aside the girls.")
- away
- back
- backward(s)
- beforehand
- downhill
- downstage
- downstairs
- downstream
- downward(s)
- downwind
- east
- eastward(s)
- forth (Note: Forth can also be used transitively in a rare sense of the term: "I may fetch you from forth this loathsome prison house.")
- forward(s)
- heavenward(s)
- hence
- henceforth
- here
- hereby
- herein
- hereof
- hereto
- herewith
- home
- homeward(s)
- indoors
- inward(s)
- leftward(s)
- north
- northeast
- northward(s)
- northwest
- now
- onward(s) (Note: Onward could also be used transitively in an obsolete sense of the term: "Two of that troupe conducted him onward the way to Babylon.")
- outdoors
- outward(s)
- overboard
- overhead
- overland
- overseas
- rightward(s)
- seaward(s)
- skyward(s)
- south
- southeast
- southward(s)
- southwest
- then
- thence
- thenceforth
- there
- thereby
- therein
- thereof
- thereto
- therewith
- together (Note: Together could also be used transitively in an obsolete sense of the term: "You will find the worth and value of it together the whole process of the great work of sugar making.")
- underfoot
- underground
- uphill
- upstage
- upstairs
- upstream
- upward(s) (Note: Upward could also be used transitively in an obsolete sense of the term: "Whether to surprise the squatted hare or flit upward ragged precipices.")
- upwind
- west
- westward(s)
- when
- whence
- where
- whereby
- wherein
- whereto
- wherewith

== Conjunctive prepositions ==
The following are single-word prepositions that take clauses as complements. Prepositions marked with an asterisk in this section can only take non-finite clauses as complements. Note that dictionaries and grammars informed by concepts from traditional grammar may categorize these conjunctive prepositions as subordinating conjunctions.

- after
- although
- as
- at*
- because
- before
- beside*
- besides*
- between*
- by*
- considering
- despite*
- except
- for
- from* (Note: An obsolete sense of from could also take a finite clause: "From we rise till we go to bed.")
- given
- granted
- if (conditional sense)
- into*
- lest
- like
- notwithstanding
- now
- of*
- on*
- once
- provided
- providing
- save
- seeing
- since
- so (purpose or result sense)
- supposing
- than
- though
- till
- to*
- unless
- until
- upon*
- when
- whenever
- where
- whereas
- wherever
- while
- whilst
- with*
- without* (Note: An obsolete sense of without could also take a finite clause: "Man can put up with only so much without he descends a rung or two on the old evolutionary ladder.")

== Postpositions ==
The following are postpositions, prepositions whose complements typically precede them. Note that some grammars classify prepositions and postpositions as different kinds of adpositions while other grammars categorize both under the heading of the more common variety in the language.

- ago
- apart
- aside
- aslant (archaic)
- away
- hence
- notwithstanding (also prepositional)
- on (usually prepositional but occurs in phrases like "ten years on")
- over (usually prepositional but occurs in phrases like "the world over")
- short (also prepositional)
- through (usually prepositional but occurs in phrases like "the whole day through")

== Complex prepositions ==
The following are prepositions that consist of multiple words. They are categorized according to their structure.

=== Preposition + preposition ===
- according to
- across from
- ahead of
- along with
- apart from
- as for
- as from (formal)
- as of
- as per
- as regards
- as to
- aside from
- away from
- back to
- because of
- counter to
- except for
- in between
- instead of (informal)
- near to
- next to
- opposite of
- out from
- out of
- outside of
- owing to
- pertaining to
- round about
- up against
- up to

=== Preposition + (article) + noun + preposition ===
English has many idiomatic expressions that act as prepositions that can be analyzed as a preposition followed by a noun (sometimes preceded by the definite or, occasionally, indefinite article) followed by another preposition. Common examples include:

- at the behest of
- at the expense of
- at the hands of
- at (the) risk of
- at variance with
- by dint of
- by means of
- by virtue of
- by way of
- for (the) sake of
- for lack of
- for/from want of
- in accordance with
- in addition to
- in case of
- in charge of
- in compliance with
- in conformity with
- in contact with
- in exchange for
- in favor of
- in front of
- in lieu of
- in (the) light of
- in line with
- in place of
- in point of
- in quest of
- in relation to
- in/with regard to
- in/with respect to
- in return for
- in search of
- in spite of
- in step with
- in touch with
- in terms of
- in the name of
- in view of
- on account of
- on behalf of
- on (the) grounds of
- on the part of
- on top of
- with a view to
- with the exception of

=== Other complex prepositions ===
The following complex prepositions do not follow either of the common structures for complex prepositions.

- à la (or a la)
- as soon as
- as well as
- close to
- due to
- far from
- in case
- other than
- per pro
- prior to
- pursuant to
- rather than
- regardless of
- subsequent to
- such as

== Archaic, dialectal, or specialized ==
The following prepositions are not widely used in Present-Day English. Some, such as bating and forby, are archaic and typically only used to convey the tone of a bygone era. Others, such as ayond and side, are generally used only by speakers of a particular variety of English. Yet others are generally only used in specialized contexts, such as abaft in nautical settings and dehors in law.

=== Prototypical prepositions ===
- abaft (nautical)
- abating (obsolete)
- abeam (nautical)
- ablow (Scottish and Irish English)
- aboon (rare)
- abouts (regional, U.S.)
- acrost (regional, Australia, England, and U.S.)
- adown (archaic; poetic; rare)
- a-eastell (obsolete; regional, Scotland)
- afore (archaic; regional, Southern and Midland U.S.; nautical)
- afornent (obsolete; regional, Scotland)
- afront (obsolete; regional)
- afterhand (rare; regional)
- again (regional)
- ahind (dialectal; archaic)
- ajax (Polari)
- alength (obsolete)
- alongst (regional, Scotland and U.S.)
- aloof (obsolete)
- alow (obsolete; regional, Scotland)
- amell (rare; regional, Northern England)
- amidmost (poetic)
- anear (archaic; regional)
- aneath (poetic; regional, Scotland)
- anent (obsolete; rare; regional, Scotland and Yorkshire)
- anewst (obsolete)
- anunder (regional, Northern England, Ireland, and Scotland)
- askant (archaic)
- asklent (regional, Northern England, Northern Ireland, and Scotland)
- astern (nautical)
- athwart (obsolete; dialectal; nautical)
- atour (regional, Scotland)
- atter (regional, Northern England, Southern U.S.)
- atween (archaic; dialectal)
- atwixt (archaic; dialectal)
- a-weather (nautical; obsolete)
- a-west (obsolete; regional, Scotland)
- awestell (obsolete; regional, Scotland)
- ayond, ayont (dialectal)
- bating (archaic)
- bedown (obsolete)
- be-east (obsolete; regional, Scotland)
- beforrow (obsolete)
- behither (obsolete)
- ben (dialectal, Scots)
- benorth (obsolete; regional, Scotland)
- besouth (obsolete; regional, Scotland)
- betwixt (archaic; poetical; dialectal)
  - 'twixt (obsolete)
- bewest (obsolete; regional, Scotland)
- bongre (obsolete)
- bout (regional)
- bove (poetic; regional)
- 'cept (colloquial)
- contrair (obsolete)
- contrary (obsolete)
- cross (dialectal; poetic)
- dehors (law; rare)
- dot (mathematics)
- durante (obsolete)
- effore (obsolete)
- emong, emonges(t) (obsolete)
- endlong, endlonges, endlongs (dialectal; obsolete)
- enduring (obsolete; rare, South and South Midland U.S.)
- ensuing (obsolete)
- even-forth (obsolete)
- ex (commerce)
- excepted (obsolete)
- extra (rare)
- fae (dialectal, Scots)
- forby(e) (archaic)
- fore (regional, U.S.)
- fornent, fornenst (obsolete; regional, Northern England and Scotland)
- foregain, foregains, foregainst (obsolete; regional, Scotland)
- forne (obsolete)
- forout, forouten (obsolete)
- forrow (obsolete; regional, Scotland)
- forth (archaic)
- fro (dialectal, Scots)
- fromward, fromwards (obsolete)
- froward (archaic)
- furth (Scotland)
- gain (obsolete)
- gainst (informal; poetic)
- gainward (obsolete)
- gin (regional, Northern England, Ireland, and Scotland)
- half-way, halfway (obsolete)
- hent (obsolete)
- inboard (nautical)
- incontrair (obsolete; regional, Scotland)
- indurand (obsolete; regional, Scotland)
- inmid, inmiddes
- inter (obsolete; rare)
- inthrough (regional, Scotland)
- intil, intill (rare; dialectal, Scots)
- inwith (obsolete; regional, Scotland)
- i'th' (archaic; poetic; regional)
- 'long (regional)
- longs (obsolete; regional, Scotland)
- longst (obsolete; poetic)
- longways (rare)
- malgrado (obsolete)
- malgré (archaic; rare)
- mang (Devon)
- maugre (archaic)
- midmost (obsolete)
- mids (obsolete)
- midward (obsolete)
- midway (rare)
- 'mong (poetic or dialectal)
- 'mongst (poetic or dialectal)
- more (obsolete)
- moreover (obsolete)
- moyening (obsolete)
- natheless, nathless (archaic; literary; rare)
- nearabout, nearbout (colloquial; regional)
- nearby (regional, Scotland)
- nearhand (regional, Northern England, Northern Ireland, and Scotland)
- 'neath (poetic)
- nigh, anigh, anighst (archaic of regional)
- nigh-hand (regional, Northern and Midland England, Ireland, and Scotland)
- nobbut (rare; regional, Northern England)
- non-obstant (obsolete)
- notwithstand (obsolete)
- noughtwithstanding (obsolete)
- offa (colloquial; regional)
- offen (regional)
- only (regional, Southern U.S. and South Midland U.S.)
- or (archaic)
- otherside (obsolete; regional, Scotland)
- outcept (obsolete)
- outen (regional)
- out-over (regional, Scotland)
- outta (colloquial; regional, U.S.)
- out-taken (obsolete)
- out-taking (obsolete)
- out-through (regional, Scotland)
- outwith (regional, Scotland)
- overcross (archaic; rare)
- over-right (regional, Scotland, Southern England, Ireland, Newfoundland)
- overthorter (obsolete; regional, Scotland)
- overthwart (archaic; regional, Eastern, Midland, and Northern England)
- overtop (regional, North America)
- pan (regional, Jamaica)
- pass (regional, Caribbean)
- pon (archaic; regional, Caribbean and Southwestern England)
- quoad (law)
- reserved (obsolete)
- reserving (obsolete)
- sauf (archaic)
- seen (obsolete)
- sen (rare; regional, Northern England and Scotland)
- senza (music)
- side (dialectal, African-American English)
- sidelings (obsolete)
- sidelong (obsolete)
- sides (dialectal, African-American English)
- sin (dialectal, Northern England English and Scots)
- sineth (obsolete)
- sith (archaic)
- sithen (obsolete)
- sithence (obsolete)
- ter (regional)
- thorough (archaic; poetic; rare)
- thorter (regional, Scotland)
- thwart (archaic; nautical; poetic)
- thwart-over (dialectal; obsolete)
- tiv (dialectal, Northern England English)
- touchant (obsolete)
- transverse (obsolete)
- traverse (obsolete)
- twel(l), twill (dialectal, African-American English)
- ultra (obsolete; poetic)
- umbe (obsolete)
- unneath (obsolete; poetic)
- upo’ (dialectal, Northern England English and Scots)
- upside (slang) (Note: This sense of upside seems limited to discussion of strikes to the head: "He went upside her head with a meat mallet." "A white cop comes up and go upside your knot.")
- upsy, upsees (archaic; obsolete)
- uptill
- utouth (obsolete; regional, Scotland)
- wid (dialectal, African-American English)
- withinside (archaic; dialectal)
- withoutside (obsolete; rare)
- wiv (dialectal, African-American English and Cockney)
- ymong (obsolete)
- yond (obsolete)
- yonside (regional, South Midland U.S.)

=== Intransitive prepositions ===
- aground (archaic; poetic)
- bush (regional, Australia)
- hereat (archaic; obsolete)
- herefrom (rare)
- hereon (rare)
- hither (archaic)
- thereat (archaic; formal)
- therefrom (archaic; formal)
- thereon (archaic; formal)
- thereupon (archaic; formal)
- thither (archaic)
- whereat (archaic; formal)
- wherefrom (archaic; formal)
- whereof (archaic; formal)
- whereon (archaic; formal)
- whither (archaic)
- yonder (archaic; dialectal)

=== Conjunctive prepositions ===
- but (archaic in uses such as "There wasn't one among them but would have taken my place.")

=== Postpositions ===
- withal (archaic)

=== Complex prepositions ===
- at after (regional, England)
- down on (colloquial)
- ex relatione (law)
- hard by (archaic)
- inside of (colloquial; regional, Australia and U.S.)
- non obstante (law)
- nigh by (obsolete)
- opposite to (regional, Britain)

== See also ==
- Preposition and postposition
- Preposition stranding
