= Impersonal verb =

Verb that has no determinate subject

In linguistics, an impersonal verb is one that has no determinate subject. For example, in the sentence "It rains", rain is an impersonal verb and the pronoun it corresponds to an exophoric referent. In many languages the verb takes a third person singular inflection and often appears with an expletive subject. In the active voice, impersonal verbs can be used to express operation of nature, mental distress, and acts with no reference to the doer. Impersonal verbs are also called weather verbs because they frequently appear in the context of weather description. Also, indefinite pronouns may be called "impersonal", as they refer to an unknown person, like one or someone, and there is overlap between the use of the two.

== Valency ==
Impersonal verbs appear only in non-finite forms or with third-person inflection. In the third person, the subject is either implied or a dummy referring to people in general. The term "impersonal" simply means that the verb does not change according to grammatical person. In terms of valency, impersonal verbs are often avalent, as they often lack semantic arguments. In the sentence It rains, the pronoun it is a dummy subject; it is merely a syntactic placeholder—it has no concrete referent. In many other languages, there would be no subject at all. In Spanish, for example, It is raining could be expressed as simply llueve.

== Use in meteorological expressions ==
Temperature expressions ("it is hot"), weather expressions ("it is snowing"), and daylight expressions ("it is dark") tend to lack independent participants with distinct semantic roles. While snow participates in snowing, very few other types of participants can participate, and the participant is indistinguishable from the event itself; this is similar to the phenomenon of cognate objects. In addition, the participating snow is non-specific, and lacks a clear semantic role. Therefore, assigning the participating snow the role of 'referent' in the default English expression "it is snowing" would seem inappropriate. Instead, linguistics classify the "is snowing" in "it is snowing" as an impersonal verb.

Meteorological expressions are often constructed with impersonal verbs in English. However, meteorological expressions are obviously not restricted solely to impersonal verbs, even in English; furthermore, different languages use different strategies for their default meteorological expressions and common idioms. In Palestinian Arabic, "Id-dunya ti-shti" translates to "It (the world) is raining" and uses a non-impersonal verb. "Vreme je sunčano", which means "the weather is sunny", is a common Serbian construction that uses a (non-impersonal) adverb rather than a verb.

== Forms ==
=== Invisible arguments ===
When an agent is unspecified, impersonal verbs are also known as zero person construction, or impersonal construction. An implicit argument (an argument that is put forth without stating it directly) is present on a semantic level for both Estonian and Finnish. The Finnic impersonal construction enables an event or state to be described without specifying the identity of the agent (actor). Despite this, the interpretation of the impersonal includes a referent of some sort (dummy). The zero person is not entirely the same as an impersonal.

Finnish:

Sunnuntaina voi nukkua pitkään.
Sunday-on can.PRS.3sg sleep.INF long.

Estonian:

Pühapäeviti saab sisse magada.
Sundays-on can.PRS.3sg in.ILL sleep.INF
On Sundays you/one can sleep in.

There is a lack of an overt nominative subject in these constructions.

=== By-phrase ===
Some languages require their counterpart to the English by-phrase be present (like Palauan and Indonesian, Austronesian languages). Other languages disallow the presence of a by-phrase. For example, Polish does not allow the use of a by-phrase in its passive.

Zapukano w drzwi (*przez sąsiada)
was-knocked at door (*by neighbor)
It was knocked at the door.
There was a knock at the door.

The content in the parenthesis causes the Polish sentence to be ungrammatical as who did the knocking cannot be overtly stated. As such, it might seem like it would be more grammatical to use impersonal verbs in such cases.

== Impersonal verbs by language ==
In some languages such as English, French, German, Dutch and Swedish, an impersonal verb always takes an impersonal pronoun (it in English, il in French, es in German, het in Dutch, det in Swedish) as its syntactical subject:

It snowed yesterday. (English)
Il a neigé hier. (French)
Es schneite gestern. (German)
Het sneeuwde gisteren. (Dutch)
Det snöade igår. (Swedish)

Occasionally an impersonal verb will allow an object to appear in apposition to the impersonal subject pronoun:

It is raining diamonds.

Or as an instrumental adjunct:

It was pouring with rain. (British English)

In some other languages (necessarily null subject languages and typically pro-drop languages), such as Portuguese, Spanish, Occitan, Catalan, Italian, Romanian, in Hungarian and all the Slavic languages, an impersonal verb takes no subject at all, but it is conjugated in the third-person singular, which is much as though it had a third-person, singular subject.

Nevó ayer. (Spanish)
Nevou ontem. (Portuguese)
Ha nevicato ieri. (Italian)
A nins ieri. (Romanian)
Sniježilo je jučer. (Croatian)
Havazott tegnap. (Hungarian)
Вчера вееше снег. / Včera veeše sneg. (Macedonian)

Other languages, those which require a subject, may permit an adjunct to assume that role.

Unfortunately the next day poured with rain.

=== Indo-European ===
==== English ====
The following sentences illustrate impersonal verbs:

(1) It rains.
(2) It is cold.
(3) It is growing dark.
(4) It seems that there is no end to this.
(5) It is unclear why he cut the rope.

The expletive pronoun it in these sentences does not denote a clear entity, yet the meaning is clear. In other words, the pronoun it has no clear antecedent. English is so strict about requiring a subject that it supplies them for verbs that do not really require them. In sentences (4) and (5), it is in the subject position, while the real subject has been moved to the end of the sentence.

A simple test can be done to see if the sentence contains an impersonal verb. One checks to see if a given subject pronoun takes an antecedent in the previous clause or sentence, e.g.

Bukit Timah is 163.63 metres tall. It is the highest point in Singapore.

Bukit Timah is 163.63 metres tall. It rains frequently there.

The two examples may seem similar, but only the pronoun it in the first example links with the previous subject. The pronoun it in the second example, on the other hand, has no referent. The hill (Bukit Timah) does not rain, it rains. This demonstrates that rain is an impersonal verb.

==== Spanish ====
There is no equivalent of the dummy subject it in Spanish. In Spanish, there are a few true impersonal avalent verbs. Most of them are "atmospheric verbs":

Llueve
It's raining
Ha helado
It froze

Most impersonal constructions in Spanish involve using a special verb in third-person defective verb with a direct object as its only argument or use of impersonal se (not to be confused with other uses of se).

There are two main impersonal verbs in Spanish: haber (to have, to be (there is/are, there were)) and hacer (to do). Haber is an irregular verb. When used as an impersonal verb in the present tense, it has a special conjugation for the third person singular (hay). Clauses with the verb haber do not have an explicit subject; its only argument is a direct object noun phrase that does not agree with the verb. Haber has its 'natural meaning' of tener 'to have'.

Hay un libro (aquí).
There is a book (here).
Hay muchos libros.
There are many books.
Hubo muchos libros (que no se vendieron).
There were many books (that were not sold).

Less frequently, and only in some expressions with a limited number of nouns in singular, the verb "hacer" in the 3rd singular is used as impersonal (Hacer is a very common verb meaning 'to do').

Hace frío.
It's cold.
Hizo frío ayer.
It was cold yesterday.
Hace viento.
It's windy.

Spanish will add the pronoun se in front of verbs to form general sentences. Impersonal voice using se will use a singular verb since se can be replaced by uno.

Se duerme mal cuando hace mucho calor.
One sleeps poorly when it's hot.

The passive voice in Spanish has similar characteristics following that of the impersonal se. It is normally formed by using se + the third person singular or plural conjugation of a verb, similar to the impersonal se. This use of se is easily confused with the medial se.

Active voice:
Mis amigos comieron torta (European and American Spanish)
My friends ate cake (i.e. some of the cake)
Mis amigos comieron la torta (American Spanish, less frequent in European Spanish)
My friends ate the cake

Medial meaning:
Mis amigos se comieron la torta
My friends ate all the cake

Passive voice:
Esta torta se come tradicionalmente en Navidad.
This cake is normally eaten during Christmas
Se vende esta casa.
This house is for sale

==== French ====
Verbs can be impersonal in French when they do not take a real personal subject as they do not represent any action, occurrence or state-of-being that can be attributed to a person, place or a thing. In French, as in English, these impersonal verbs take on the impersonal pronoun - il in French.

Il faut que tu fasses tes devoirs.
It is necessary that you do your homework.

The il is a dummy subject and does not refer to anything in particular in this phrase. The most common impersonal form is il y a, meaning there is, there are. Note its other tenses (il y avait, il y a eu, il y aura, etc.).

French makes a distinction between a dummy subject and an actual subject in clauses with infinitives by the use of a different preposition. The preposition de is used with dummy subjects and the preposition à is used with real subjects. Compare:

It's important to learn. (= Learning is important.) - dummy subject
Il est important d'apprendre.

It's important to learn. (= This is important to learn.) - real subject
Il est important à apprendre.

==== German ====
Impersonal verbs are relatively common in German, often in constructions about a state or process. Common examples include es brennt ("there is a fire", literally "it burns"), es zieht ("there is a draft", literally "it draws") and es klopft ("there is a knock at the door", literally "it knocks"), as well as the whimsical es weihnachtet sehr ("it is very Christmassy", literally "it is Christmas-ing hard").

Many statements asserting existence also use an impersonal form. Often the equivalent sentences in English start with there.

Es gibt
There is
Es kamen
There came

==== Celtic languages ====
The Celtic languages also possess impersonal verbal forms though their use is usually translated into English by forms such as 'one sees' (Welsh: gwelir), 'one did' (Welsh: gwnaethpwyd), 'one is' (Irish: táthar) etc., in which the 'one' is taken to be an empty subject. For weather, personal verbs are used in Celtic languages, e.g. Welsh Mae hi'n bwrw eira 'it is snowing'.

Verbs meaning existence may also be impersonal.

Mae llyfrau. / Mae llyfr. (Welsh)
Tá leabhair ann. / Tá leabhar ann. (Irish)
There are (some) books. / There is a book.

However, sometimes there are intransitive verbs with more or less the same meaning:

Mae llyfrau'n bodoli. / Mae llyfr yn bodoli. (Welsh)
(Some) books exist. / A book exists.

==== Latin ====
Latin has several impersonal verbs, most often seen in the third person singular. The real subject of the sentence will not be in the nominative case but is most often in the dative or accusative case. These verbs include:

- Decet – it becomes/suits; it is right/proper
- Libet – it pleases
- Licet – it is permitted/allowed
- Oportet – it is proper/fitting
- Placet – it is agreed/resolved

=== Tai-Kadai ===
==== Thai ====
Impersonal verbs in Thai do not allow for an overt grammatical subject. The impersonal verbs occur only with transitive verbs.

kəət3 phɛɛndinwaày thîï4 yîïpùn
happen earthquake at Japan
There is an earthquake in Japan.

*man kəət3 phɛɛndinwaày thîï4 yîïpùn
*it happen earthquake in Japan
*There is an earthquake in Japan.

There is no allowance for the presence of a non-referential subject man 'it' in the case frame. In general, it is not allowed in formal speech, such as news reports. However, the presence of non-referential subject man can occur in the colloquial form.

man mii phîï nay bâan nii dûay rəə
it exist ghost in house this also Ques
Is there also a ghost in this house?

Subdivision into non-inception and inception subclasses can occur depending on whether the verb may occur with the path adverb khin 'up'.

=== Constructed languages ===
In the auxiliary language Interlingua, verbs are not conjugated by person. Impersonal verbs take the pronoun il:

Il ha nivate heri.

In the auxiliary language Esperanto, where verbs also are not conjugated for person, impersonal verbs are simply stated with no subject given or implied, even though Esperanto is otherwise not a null subject language:

Neĝis hieraŭ.

In the logical language Lojban, impersonal verbs simply have no first argument filled and might not have any arguments filled at all:

carvi ca lo prulamdei

where carvi is a verb meaning x_{1} rains to x_{2} from x_{3} (x_{1}, x_{2}, and x_{3} being core arguments).

== Comparison to other linguistic classifications ==
=== Weather verb ===
Verbs which are used to describe the weather, are often noted to be impersonal verbs in some languages. Some linguists consider the impersonal subject of a weather verb to be a "dummy pronoun", while others have been critical of this interpretation on the basis of their role as objects in the arguments of verb clauses. In Mandarin Chinese, there are weather verbs which may take no subject or object.

=== Impersonal pronoun ===
An impersonal pronoun, or dummy pronoun, lacks a reference; in English, the usual example is "it" when used with an impersonal verb. Some sources classify certain uses of "one" (ex. "what should one say?") or "you" (ex. "you only live once") as "human impersonal pronouns". An impersonal pronoun, when used, serves as an empty placeholder, or "dummy subject", for the sentence.

Examples:

You would think the inner dome of heaven had fallen.
The young comedian was awful; one felt embarrassed for him.
If one fails, then one must try harder next time.

When the pronoun one is used in the numerical sense (rather than as a dummy pronoun), a different pronoun can be used subsequently to referring to the same entity.

We watched as one [of the ospreys] dried its feathers in the sun.
One [driver] pulled her car over to the side.

Generally, it is not ideal to mix the impersonal pronoun one with another pronoun in the same sentence.

If one fails, then he/you must simply try harder.

=== Null objects ===
While the concept of impersonal verbs is closely related to phenomenon of null subjects, null objects have to do with the lack of the obligatory projection of an object position.

In French

C'est pas lui qui l'a écrit, son livre, le pape, c'est quelqu'un qui lui écrit __.
The Pope didn't write his book himself, someone writes __ for him.

In English

Why then do the psychic gifts often seem to tease __, confuse __ and obstruct __?

Null objects can be understood as implicit anaphoric direct objects, that is, those whose referents can be understood from the prior or ongoing discourse context as well as sufficiently salient in that context not only to be encoded pronominally, but even to be entirely omitted. However, it is not imperative that the referent of the direct object has been referred to explicitly previously in the discourse; it could instead be accessible extra-linguistically due to its salience to the interlocutors.

=== Defective verb ===
An impersonal verb is different from a defective verb in that, with an impersonal verb, only one possible syntactical subject is meaningful (either expressed or not), whereas with a defective verb, certain choices of subject might not be grammatically possible, because the verb does not have a complete conjugation.

== In universal grammar theory ==
Impersonal verbs can be considered null subject data. They involve a general concern in generative grammar: determining the nature and distribution of phonetically null but syntactically present entities (empty categories). Since, by definition, these entities are absent from the speech signal, it is of interest that language learners still can come to have information about them. As this phenomenon could not have resulted from sufficient prior experience, it suggests the role of universal grammar.

== See also ==
- Gender-specific and gender-neutral third-person pronouns
- Generic you
- Impersonal passive voice
- Impersonal pronoun "one"
- Null-subject language
- Transitive verb
- Transitivity (grammar)
