= English grammar =

Grammar of the English language

English grammar is the set of structural rules of the English language. This includes the structure of words, phrases, clauses, sentences, and whole texts.

Most English speech and writing follows the conventions of Standard English; but minor divergences occur depending on historical, regional, and cultural contexts. Larger divergences occur when comparing pronunciation and vocabulary.

Personal pronouns retain morphological case more strongly than any other word class (a remnant of the more extensive Germanic case system of Old English). For other pronouns and all nouns, adjectives, and articles, grammatical function is indicated only by word order, prepositions, and the "Saxon genitive or English possessive" (-'s).

== Word classes and phrases ==
=== Word classes ===
Traditionally known as "parts of speech," word classes are defined by the Oxford Dictionary of English Grammar as "set[s] of linguistic items with shared characteristics." In modern English grammar, these items are divided into eight main categories: noun, determiners, adjective, verb, preposition, adverb, conjunction, and interjection.

Grammarians separate these categories into two broad types based on how they accept new words. An open class can expand limitlessly as the language evolves. This group includes nouns, main verbs, adverbs and adjectives. For example, the word celebutante arose as a relatively new portmanteau noun for a celebrity in fashion circles. Open classes are also called lexical words; they have several features:

- they are the main conveyors of information in a text or speech act (the use of language to accomplish a specific purpose).
- they often have an internal arrangement of parts: e.g. unsuccessful = un + success + ful.
- they are often the words stressed most in speech.
- they are commonly the words that remain if a sentence is shrunk in a newspaper headline: e.g. Climate change crisis warning.

By contrast, a closed class is a fixed grammatical set to which new words are rarely, if ever, added. This group includes items like articles, pronouns, modal verbs, prepositions and conjunctions. Some grammars treat pronouns and articles as separate groups, while others categorize them by how they function in a sentence. Under this approach, pronouns are treated as a special subgroup of nouns, while articles are placed under a single class called determinatives, which also includes words like this, some, and any. The normally strict boundaries of certain closed classes such as prepositions and conjunctions are occasionally blurred as a speech community's language habits change. For example, the word plus functioned as either a noun or a preposition until the mid-20th century, but it has since been adopted colloquially as a conjunction meaning and—as in, "The restaurant has great food, plus it's cheap."

Interjections are a minor class of words or inserts that stand outside the normal grammar of a sentence and are primarily used in speech to express sudden emotions, attitudes, or reactions; some examples are ah, oh, ouch, and wow.

A lexeme is a word in the abstract sense—a word in its basic meaning—that appears as a distinct unit in a lexicon or as an entry in a dictionary, thus also a "dictionary word." This is contrasted with an orthographic word, which is simply the written or printed word as it appears on the page or when typed into a word processor. To understand how a word exists in this abstract sense, consider the word fit. It can appear as a noun in a medical or emotional sense, such as "a fit of laughter," or as a noun meaning size, as in "the off-the-rack suit could not have been a better fit." Because a dictionary treats these two meanings as separate headwords, they correspond to two different lexemes (typically listed in the dictionary separately as FIT n^{a} and FIT n^{b}). However, fit can also serve as a verb. The dictionary entry for the verb fit includes forms such as fits ("the coat fits"), fitted ("the tailor fitted him"), and fitting ("she is fitting the dress"). While a word processor counts fit, fits, fitted, and fitting as separate written words, they belong to one lexeme, FIT v, as they all share the same basic meaning. For this reason, some grammarians consider a lexeme an abstract concept—a collection of all manifestations of the headword in different grammatical roles. Thus, instead of just FIT v, the lexeme in this conception would comprise the set {fit, fits, fitted, fitting}. Lexemes also include meaningful word attachments (e.g., mega-, -wise as in megabyte, clockwise), a familiar multi-word expression (e.g., bite the bullet), or a standard shortened word (e.g., phone for telephone).

An inflection, on the other hand, is a specific orthographic variation of a lexeme that signals a particular grammatical function in a sentence, such as tense, number, or degree. Consider the following sentence from a novel by V. S. Naipaul, "It fitted a real grief where melancholy had created a vacancy." Here, the verb lexeme FIT v appears as the inflection, fitted, to signal past tense. By contrast, the verb lexeme CREATE v signals the past perfect tense by the use of a two-word combination: the auxiliary verb had paired with the inflected past participle created. Consider another sentence, this time from a short story of Arthur Quiller-Couch, "The bullets in the jeweller's body do not fit your pistols, but came from a larger pair." Here two noun lexemes BULLET n and PISTOL n are inflected for number, and the adjective lexeme LARGE adj is inflected for degree, assuming the forms bullets, pistols, and larger to fit into the grammar of the sentence. However, words such as the (definite article), in and from (prepositions), your (possessive determiner/pronoun), and but (coordinating conjunction) do not change. Thus, in English, lexemes in the open classes (such as verbs, nouns, and adjectives) can serve different grammatical roles and appear as different inflections, but lexemes in the closed classes keep a single, uninflected form. The grammatical changes associated with inflections almost always occur as suffixes attached to the ends of words.

Out of context, English words rarely give clues to their word class; a single orthographic form can correspond to multiple dictionary entries. For example, fitting is the present participle of the verb to fit, but it is also a polysemous adjective—meaning it has two different adjective senses that share a common historical origin—and a polysemous noun, similarly meaning its different noun senses share a common origin. Consider the sentence: "The not so fitting start to the day coincided with the groom's fitting when the tailor noticed a brass fitting on the rack had snagged the close-fitting tuxedo." The standalone adjective (fitting) and the compound adjective close-fitting, created by fusing a modifying adverb (close) with the base participle (fitting), share a single adjective entry in the dictionary, where they are typically distinguished using subentries like: FITTING particip adj^{a, b} Similarly, the tailor's session and the physical brass hardware share a single noun entry.

=== Phrases ===
Words do not exist disjointedly in a sentence; they group together, combine, or cluster to form phrases, which function like single word classes—and in the grammatical hierarchy lie between a word and a clause. Though traditionally defined as a group of two or more words, a phrase can be a single word if it can be the central element of a potential expansion or the last word remaining in a potential collapse. The largest phrase in a sentence can often be located using a variety of empirical constituency tests.

Consider a sentence from Jack London's White Fang:

"White Fang's suspicious eyes followed every movement."

In the method examples below, the substituted or removed text is indicated with subscripts and strikethrough, and an asterisk (*) signals an ungrammatical sentence.

- Pro-form substitution replaces a cluster of words within a sentence with "It" or "They." If the sentence remains valid, it provides evidence that the cluster is a phrase.

- "They followed every movement."_{<~~White Fang's suspicious eyes~~>} or
- "White Fang's suspicious eyes followed it"_{<~~every movement~~>}
- But not: * "White Fang's suspicious eyes followed every it"_{<~~movement~~>}

- Passivization: checks whether a phrase can validly move to a different position in a sentence, for example:

- Every movement was followed by White Fang's suspicious eyes.

- Clefting in the form of It- or What- is also used to uncover valid phrases:

- It was White Fang's suspicious eyes that followed every movement.
- But not: * It was White Fang's suspicious eyes followed that every movement.
- What White Fang's suspicious eyes followed was every movement.

- Fronting or did-inversion:

- Every movement White Fang's suspicious eyes followed.
- But not: * Every White Fang's suspicious eyes followed movement.
- Every movement did White Fang's suspicious eyes follow.

- Because different phrase types behave uniquely, no single operation serves as a mathematically necessary and sufficient condition for isolating a phrase. Instead, linguists treat these tests as diagnostics, in which successfully clearing two or three distinct operations provides robust, converging evidence of a phrase's boundary.
- This establishes that "White Fang's suspicious eyes" and "every movement" are the largest phrases in the sentence.
- Phrases can also be embedded in other phrases, and we can show these with bracketing or a tree: [[[White Fang's] [suspicious] [eyes]] [[followed] [[every] [movement]]]]

We can isolate a phrase's most significant word by systematically deleting one word at a time and seeing which deletion results in an ungrammatical sentence. Consider the phrases, White Fang's suspicious eyes and every movement:

- Phrase: [White Fang's suspicious eyes]

- Delete White: [Fang's suspicious eyes] followed every movement._{<~~White~~>}
- Delete Fang's: [White suspicious eyes] followed every movement. _{<~~Fang's~~>} (though White changes from a proper name to a color adjective).
- Delete suspicious: [White Fang's eyes] followed every movement._{<~~suspicious~~>}
- Delete eyes : * [White Fang's suspicious] followed every movement._{<~~eyes~~>} ❌ (COLLAPSE)

Because deleting "eyes" leaves an ungrammatical sentence fragment, "eyes" is the key element in the phrase, whose presence is obligatory, and is called the head. Words whose deletion does not break the grammar, and which are ancillary, are called adjuncts. Similarly, "movement" is the head of every movement. The word class of the head determines the word class of the phrase; moreover, the head bears the principal semantic burden of the phrase. If the head is a noun, then the phrase is called a noun phrase, and behaves grammatically like a noun. When the head is a verb, adjective, adverb, or preposition, the phrase is a verb phrase, adjective phrase, adverb phrase, or prepositional phrase. Each of these phrasal categories exhibits its own unique internal structure and rules of complementation, which are explored along with their respective head classes in the sections below.

=== Nouns ===
Many common suffixes form nouns from other nouns or from other types of words, such as -age (shrinkage), -hood (sisterhood), and so on, though many nouns are base forms containing no such suffix (cat, grass, France). Nouns are also created by converting verbs and adjectives, as with the words talk and reading (a boring talk, the assigned reading).

Nouns are sometimes classified semantically (by their meanings) as proper and common nouns (Cyrus, China vs frog, milk) or as concrete and abstract nouns (book, laptop vs embarrassment, prejudice). A grammatical distinction is often made between count (countable) nouns such as clock and city, and non-count (uncountable) nouns such as milk and decor. Some nouns can function both as countable and as uncountable such as "wine" in This is a good wine.

Countable nouns generally have singular and plural forms. In most cases the plural is formed from the singular by adding -[e]s (as in dogs, bushes), although there are also irregular forms (woman/women, foot/feet), including cases where the two forms are identical (sheep, series). For more details see English plural. Certain nouns can be used with plural verbs even though they are singular in form, as in The government were ... (where the government is considered to refer to the people constituting the government). This is a form of synesis, and is more common in British than American English. See English plural § Singulars with collective meaning treated as plural.

English nouns are not marked for case as they are in some languages, but they have possessive forms, through the addition of -'s (as in John's, children's) or just an apostrophe (with no change in pronunciation) in the case of -[e]s plurals (the dogs' owners) and sometimes other words ending with -s (Jesus' love). More generally the ending can be applied to noun phrases (as in the man you saw yesterday's sister); see below. The possessive form can be used either as a determiner (Manyanda's cat) or as a noun phrase (Manyanda's is the one next to Jane's).

The status of the possessive as an affix or a clitic is the subject of debate. It differs from the noun inflection of languages such as German, in that the genitive ending may attach to the last word of the phrase. To account for this, the possessive can be analysed, for instance as a clitic construction (an "enclitic postposition") or as an inflection of the last word of a phrase ("edge inflection").

==== Phrases ====
Noun phrases are phrases that function grammatically as nouns within sentences, for example as the subject or object of a verb. Most noun phrases have a noun as their head.

An English noun phrase typically takes the following form (not all elements need be present):

Determiner	+	Pre-modifiers	+	NOUN	+	Postmodifiers/Complement

In this structure:

- the determiner may be an article (the, a[n]) or other equivalent word, as described in the following section. In many contexts, it is required for a noun phrase to include some determiner.
- pre-modifiers include adjectives and some adjective phrases (such as red, really lovely), and noun adjuncts (such as college in the phrase the college student). Adjectival modifiers usually come before noun adjuncts.
- a complement or postmodifier may be a prepositional phrase (... of London), a relative clause (like ... which we saw yesterday), certain adjective or participial phrases (... sitting on the beach), or a dependent clause or infinitive phrase appropriate to the noun (like ... that the world is round after a noun such as fact or statement, or ... to travel widely after a noun such as desire).

An example of a noun phrase that includes all of the above-mentioned elements is that rather attractive young college student to whom you were talking. Here that is the determiner, rather attractive and young are adjectival pre-modifiers, college is a noun adjunct, student is the noun serving as the head of the phrase, and to whom you were talking is a post-modifier (a relative clause in this case). Notice the order of the pre-modifiers; the determiner that must come first and the noun adjunct college must come after the adjectival modifiers.

Coordinators such as and, or, and but can be used at various levels in noun phrases, as in John, Paul, and Mary; the matching green coat and hat; a dangerous but exciting ride; a person sitting down or standing up. See § Conjunctions below for more explanation.

Noun phrases can also be placed in apposition (where two consecutive phrases refer to the same thing), as in that president, Abraham Lincoln, ... (where that president and Abraham Lincoln are in apposition). In some contexts, the same can be expressed by a prepositional phrase, as in the twin curses of famine and pestilence (meaning "the twin curses" that are "famine and pestilence").

Particular forms of noun phrases include:

- phrases formed by the determiner the with an adjective, as in the homeless, the English (these are plural phrases referring to homeless people or English people in general);
- phrases with a pronoun rather than a noun as the head (see below);
- phrases consisting just of a possessive;
- infinitive and gerund phrases, in certain positions;
- certain clauses, such as that clauses and content clauses like what he said, in certain positions.

==== Gender ====
A system of grammatical gender, whereby every noun was treated as either masculine, feminine, or neuter, existed in Old English, but fell out of use during the Middle English period. Modern English retains features relating to natural gender, most prominently the use of pronouns (such as he and she) to refer specifically to persons or animals of one or other genders and certain others (such as it) for sexless objects – although feminine pronouns are sometimes used when referring to ships (and more uncommonly some airplanes and analogous machinery) and nation-states.

Some aspects of gender usage in English have been influenced by the movement towards a preference for gender-neutral language. Animals are triple-gender nouns, being able to take masculine, feminine and neuter pronouns. While the vast majority of nouns in English do not carry gender, there remain some gendered nouns (e.g. ewe, sow, rooster) and derivational affixes (e.g. widower, waitress) that denote gender.

Masculine	Feminine	Gender neutral
man	woman	adult
boy	girl	child
husband	wife	spouse
actor	actress	performer
rooster	hen	chicken

Many nouns that mention people's roles and jobs can refer to either a masculine or a feminine subject, for instance "cousin", "teenager", "teacher", "doctor", "student", "friend", and "colleague".

- Jane is my friend. She is a dentist.
- Paul is my cousin. He is a dentist.

Often the gender distinction for these neutral nouns is established by inserting the word "male" or "female".

- Sam is a male nurse.
- No, he is not my boyfriend; he is just a male friend.
- I have three female cousins and two male cousins.

Rarely, nouns illustrating things with no gender are referred to with a gendered pronoun to convey familiarity. It is also standard to use the gender-neutral pronoun (it).

- I love my car. She [the car] is my greatest passion.
- France is popular with her [France's] neighbors at the moment.
- I traveled from England to New York on the Queen Elizabeth; she [the Queen Elizabeth] is a great ship.

=== Determiners ===
English determiners constitute a relatively small class of words. They include the articles the and a[n]; certain demonstrative and interrogative words such as this, that, and which; possessives such as my and whose (the role of determiner can also be played by noun possessive forms such as John's and the girl's); various quantifying words like some, many, various; and numerals (one, two, etc.). There are also many phrases (such as a couple of) that can play the role of determiners.

Determiners are used in the formation of noun phrases (see above). Many words that serve as determiners can also be used as pronouns (this, that, many, etc.).

Determiners can be used in certain combinations, such as all the water and the many problems.

In many contexts, it is required for a noun phrase to be completed with an article or some other determiner. It is not grammatical to say just cat sat on table; one must say my cat sat on the table. The most common situations in which a complete noun phrase can be formed without a determiner are when it refers generally to a whole class or concept (as in dogs are dangerous and beauty is subjective) and when it is a name (Jane, Spain, etc.). This is discussed in more detail at English articles and Zero article in English.

=== Pronouns ===
Pronouns are a relatively small, closed class of words that function in the place of nouns or noun phrases. They include personal pronouns, demonstrative pronouns, relative pronouns, interrogative pronouns, and some others, mainly indefinite pronouns. The full set of English pronouns is presented in the following table. Nonstandard, informal and archaic forms are in italics.

			Nominative	Accusative	Reflexive	Independent genitive	Dependent genitive
			(subject)	(object)		(possessive)	
First-person	Singular		I	me	myself	mine	my mine (before vowel) me (esp. BrE)
First-person	Plural		we	us	ourselves ourself	ours	our
Second-person	Singular	Standard	you	you	yourself	yours	your
Second-person	Singular	Archaic informal	thou	thee	thyself	thine	thy thine (before vowel)
Second-person	Plural	Standard	you	you	yourselves	yours	your
Second-person	Plural	Archaic	ye	you	yourselves	yours	your
Second-person	Plural	Nonstandard	ye you all y'all youse etc. (see above)	ye you all y'all youse	yeerselves y'all's (or y'alls) selves	yeers y'all's (or y'alls)	yeer y'all's (or y'alls)
Third-person	Singular	Masculine	he	him	himself	his	
Third-person	Singular	Feminine	she	her	herself	hers	her
Third-person	Singular	Neuter	it	it	itself	its	its
Third-person	Singular	Epicene	they	them	themselves themself	theirs	their
Third-person	Plural		they	them	themselves	theirs	their
Generic	Formal		one	one	oneself		one's
Generic	Informal		you	you	yourself	your	your
Wh-	Relative and interrogative	For persons	who	whom who		whose^{†}	whose
Wh-	Relative and interrogative	Non-personal	what	what			
Wh-	Relative only		which	which			
Reciprocal				each other one another			
Dummy			there it	it			

^{†} Interrogative only.

==== Personal ====
The personal pronouns of modern standard English are presented in the table above. They are I, you, she, he, it, we, and they. The personal pronouns are so-called not because they apply to persons (which other pronouns also do), but because they participate in the system of grammatical person (1st, 2nd, 3rd).

The second-person forms such as you are used with both singular and plural reference. In the Southern United States, y'all (you all) is used as a plural form, and various other phrases such as you guys are used in other places. An archaic set of second-person pronouns used for singular reference is thou, thee, thyself, thy, thine, which are still used in religious services and can be seen in older works, such as Shakespeare's—in such texts, the you set of pronouns are used for plural reference, or with singular reference as a formal V-form. You can also be used as an indefinite pronoun, referring to a person in general (see generic you), compared to the more formal alternative, one (reflexive oneself, possessive one's).

The third-person singular forms are differentiated according to the gender of the referent. For example, she is used to refer to a woman, sometimes a female animal, and sometimes an object to which feminine characteristics are attributed, such as a ship or a country. A man, and sometimes a male animal, is referred to using he. In other cases, it can be used. (See Gender in English.) The word it can also be used as a dummy subject, concerning abstract ideas like time, weather, etc., or a dummy object of a verb or preposition.

The third-person form they is used with both plural and singular referents. Historically, singular they was restricted to quantificational constructions such as Each employee should clean their desk and referential cases where the referent's gender was unknown. However, it is increasingly used when the referent's gender is irrelevant or when the referent is neither male nor female.

The possessive determiners such as my are used as determiners together with nouns, as in my old man, some of his friends. The second possessive forms like mine are used when they do not qualify a noun: as pronouns, as in mine is bigger than yours, and as predicates, as in this one is mine. Note also the construction a friend of mine (meaning "someone who is my friend"). See English possessive for more details.

==== Demonstrative ====
The demonstrative pronouns of English are this (plural these), and that (plural those), as in these are good, I like that. All four words can also be used as determiners (followed by a noun), as in those cars. They can also form the alternative pronominal expressions this/that one, these/those ones.

==== Interrogative ====
The interrogative pronouns are who, what, and which (all of them can take the suffix -ever for emphasis). The pronoun who refers to a person or people; it has an oblique form whom (though in informal contexts this is usually replaced by who), and a possessive form (pronoun or determiner) whose. The pronoun what refers to things or abstracts. The word which is used to ask about alternatives from what is seen as a closed set: which (of the books) do you like best? (It can also be an interrogative determiner: which book?; this can form the alternative pronominal expressions which one and which ones.) Which, who, and what can be either singular or plural, although who and what often take a singular verb regardless of any supposed number. For more information see who.

In Old and Middle English, the roles of the three words were different from their roles today. "The interrogative pronoun hwā 'who, what' had only singular forms and also only distinguished between non-neuter and neuter, the neuter nominative form being hwæt". Note that neuter and non-neuter refers to the grammatical gender system of the time, rather than the so-called natural gender system of today. A small holdover of this is the ability of relative (but not interrogative) whose to refer to non-persons (e.g., the car whose door won't open).

All the interrogative pronouns can also be used as relative pronouns, though what is quite limited in its use; see below for more details.

==== Relative ====
The main relative pronouns in English are who (with its derived forms whom and whose), which, and that.

The relative pronoun which refers to things rather than persons, as in the shirt, which used to be red, is faded. For persons, who is used (the man who saw me was tall). The oblique case form of who is whom, as in the man whom I saw was tall, although in informal registers who is commonly used in place of whom.

The possessive form of who is whose (for example, the man whose car is missing); however the use of whose is not restricted to persons (one can say an idea whose time has come).

The word that as a relative pronoun is normally found only in restrictive relative clauses (unlike which and who, which can be used in both restrictive and unrestrictive clauses). It can refer to either persons or things, and cannot follow a preposition. For example, one can say the song that [or which] I listened to yesterday, but the song to which [not to that] I listened yesterday. The relative pronoun that is usually pronounced with a reduced vowel (schwa), and hence differently from the demonstrative that (see Weak and strong forms in English). If that is not the subject of the relative clause, it can be omitted (the song I listened to yesterday).

The word what can be used to form a free relative clause – one that has no antecedent and that serves as a complete noun phrase in itself, as in I like what he likes. The words whatever and whichever can be used similarly, in the role of either pronouns (whatever he likes) or determiners (whatever book he likes). When referring to persons, who(ever) (and whom(ever)) can be used in a similar way.

==== "There" ====
The word there is used as a pronoun in some sentences, playing the role of a dummy subject, normally of an intransitive verb. The "logical subject" of the verb then appears as a complement after the verb.

This use of there occurs most commonly with forms of the verb be in existential clauses, to refer to the presence or existence of something. For example: There is a heaven; There are two cups on the table; There have been a lot of problems lately. It can also be used with other verbs: There exist two major variants; There occurred a very strange incident.

The dummy subject takes the number (singular or plural) of the logical subject (complement), hence it takes a plural verb if the complement is plural. In informal English, however, the contraction there's is often used for both singular and plural.

The dummy subject can undergo inversion, Is there a test today? and Never has there been a man such as this. It can also appear without a corresponding logical subject, in short sentences and question tags: There wasn't a discussion, was there? There was.

The word there in such sentences has sometimes been analyzed as an adverb, or as a dummy predicate, rather than as a pronoun. However, its identification as a pronoun is most consistent with its behavior in inverted sentences and question tags as described above.

Because the word there can also be a deictic adverb (meaning "at/to that place"), a sentence like There is a river could have either of two meanings: "a river exists" (with there as a pronoun), and "a river is in that place" (with there as an adverb). In speech, the adverbial there would be given stress, while the pronoun would not – in fact, the pronoun is often pronounced as a weak form, /ðə(r)/.

==== Reciprocal ====
The English reciprocal pronouns are each other and one another. No consistent distinction in meaning or use can be found between them. Like the reflexive pronouns, their use is limited to contexts where an antecedent precedes it. In the case of the reciprocals, they need to appear in the same clause as the antecedent.

==== Other ====
Other pronouns in English are often identical in form to determiners (especially quantifiers), such as many, a little, etc. Sometimes, the pronoun form is different, as with none (corresponding to the determiner no), nothing, everyone, somebody, etc. Many examples are listed as indefinite pronouns. Another indefinite (or impersonal) pronoun is one (with its reflexive form oneself and possessive one's), which is a more formal alternative to generic you.

=== Verbs ===
The basic form of an English verb is not generally marked by any ending, although there are certain suffixes that are frequently used to form verbs, such as -ate (formulate), -fy (electrify), and -ize/ise (realize/realise). Many verbs also contain prefixes, such as un- (unmask), out- (outlast), over- (overtake), and under- (undervalue). Verbs can also be formed from nouns and adjectives by zero derivation, as with the verbs snare, nose, dry, and calm.

Most verbs have three or four inflected forms in addition to the base form: a third-person singular present tense form in -(e)s (writes, botches), a present participle and gerund form in -ing (writing), a past tense (wrote), and – though often identical to the past tense form – a past participle (written). Regular verbs have identical past tense and past participle forms in -ed, but there are 100 or so irregular English verbs with different forms (see list). The verbs have, do and say also have irregular third-person present tense forms (has, does /dʌz/, says /sɛz/). The verb be has the largest number of irregular forms (am, is, are in the present tense, was, were in the past tense, been for the past participle).

Most of what are often referred to as verb tenses (or sometimes aspects) in English are formed using auxiliary verbs. Apart from what are called the simple present (write, writes) and simple past (wrote), there are also continuous (progressive) forms (am/is/are/was/were writing), perfect forms (have/has/had written, and the perfect continuous have/has/had been writing), future forms (will write, will be writing, will have written, will have been writing), and conditionals (also called "future in the past"), so forms equivalent to future ones but with would instead of will. The auxiliaries shall and should sometimes replace will and would in the first person. For the uses of these various verb forms, see English verbs and English clause syntax.

The basic form of the verb (be, write, play) is used as the infinitive, although there is also a "to-infinitive" (to be, to write, to play) used in many syntactical constructions. There are also infinitives corresponding to other aspects: (to) have written, (to) be writing, (to) have been writing. The second-person imperative is identical to the (basic) infinitive; other imperative forms may be made with let (let us go, or let's go; let them eat cake).

A form identical to the infinitive can be used as a present subjunctive in certain contexts: It is important that he follow them or ... that he be committed to the cause. There is also a past subjunctive (distinct from the simple past only in the possible use of were instead of was), used in some conditional sentences and similar: if I were (or was) rich ...; were he to arrive now ...; I wish she were (or was) here. For details see English subjunctive.

The passive voice is formed using the verb be (in the appropriate tense or form) with the past participle of the verb in question: cars are driven, he was killed, I am being tickled, it is nice to be pampered, etc. The performer of the action may be introduced in a prepositional phrase with by (as in they were killed by the invaders).

The English modal verbs consist of the core modals can, could, may, might, must, shall, should, will, would, as well as ought (to), had better, and in some uses dare and need. These do not inflect for person or number, do not occur alone, and do not have infinitive or participle forms (except synonyms, as with be/being/been able (to) for the modals can/could). The modals are used with the basic infinitive form of a verb (I can swim, he may be killed, we dare not move, need they go?), except for ought, which takes to (you ought to go). Modals can indicate the condition, probability, possibility, necessity, obligation and ability exposed by the speaker's or writer's attitude or expression.

The copula be, along with the modal verbs and the other auxiliaries, form a distinct class, sometimes called "special verbs" or simply "auxiliaries". These have different syntax from ordinary lexical verbs, especially in that they make their interrogative forms by plain inversion with the subject, and their negative forms by adding not after the verb (could I ...? I could not ...). Apart from those already mentioned, this class may also include used to (although the forms did he use to? and he didn't use to are also found), and sometimes have even when not an auxiliary (forms like have you a sister? and he hadn't a clue are possible, though becoming less common). It also includes the auxiliary do (does, did); this is used with the basic infinitive of other verbs (those not belonging to the "special verbs" class) to make their question and negation forms, as well as emphatic forms (do I like you?; he doesn't speak English; we did close the refrigerator). For more details of this, see do-support.

Some forms of the copula and auxiliaries often appear as contractions, as in I'm for I am, you'd for you would or you had, and John's for John is. Their negated forms with following not are also often contracted (see § Negation below). For detail see English auxiliaries and contractions.

==== Phrases ====
A verb together with its dependents, excluding its subject, may be identified as a verb phrase (although this concept is not acknowledged in all theories of grammar). A verb phrase headed by a finite verb may also be called a predicate. The dependents may be objects, complements, and modifiers (adverbs or adverbial phrases). In English, objects and complements nearly always come after the verb; a direct object precedes other complements such as prepositional phrases, but if there is an indirect object as well, expressed without a preposition, then that precedes the direct object: give me the book, but give the book to me. Adverbial modifiers generally follow objects, although other positions are possible (see under § Adverbs below). Certain verb–modifier combinations, particularly when they have independent meaning (such as take on and get up), are known as "phrasal verbs".

For details of possible patterns, see English clause syntax. See the Non-finite clauses section of that article for verb phrases headed by non-finite verb forms, such as infinitives and participles.

=== Adjectives ===
English adjectives, as with other word classes, cannot in general be identified as such by their form, although many of them are formed from nouns or other words by the addition of a suffix, such as -al (habitual), -ful (blissful), -ic (atomic), -ish (impish, youngish), -ous (hazardous), etc.; or from other adjectives using a prefix: disloyal, irredeemable, unforeseen, overtired.

Adjectives may be used attributively, as part of a noun phrase (nearly always preceding the noun they modify; for exceptions see postpositive adjective), as in the big house, or predicatively, as in the house is big. Certain adjectives are restricted to one or other use; for example, drunken is attributive (a drunken sailor), while drunk is usually predicative (the sailor was drunk).

==== Comparison ====
Many adjectives have comparative and superlative forms in -er and -est, such as faster and fastest (from the positive form fast). Spelling rules which maintain pronunciation apply to suffixing adjectives just as they do for similar treatment of regular past tense formation; these cover consonant doubling (as in bigger and biggest, from big) and the change of y to i after consonants (as in happier and happiest, from happy).

The adjectives good and bad have the irregular forms better, best and worse, worst; also far becomes farther, farthest or further, furthest. The adjective old (for which the regular older and oldest are usual) also has the irregular forms elder and eldest, these generally being restricted to use in comparing siblings and in certain independent uses. For the comparison of adverbs, see Adverbs below.

Many adjectives, however, particularly those that are longer and less common, do not have inflected comparative and superlative forms. Instead, they can be qualified with more and most, as in beautiful, more beautiful, most beautiful (this construction is also sometimes used even for adjectives for which inflected forms do exist).

Certain adjectives are classed as ungradable. These represent properties that cannot be compared on a scale; they simply apply or do not, as with pregnant, dead, unique. Consequently, comparative and superlative forms of such adjectives are not normally used, except in a figurative, humorous or imprecise context. Similarly, such adjectives are not normally qualified with modifiers of degree such as very and fairly, although with some of them it is idiomatic to use adverbs such as completely. Another type of adjective sometimes considered ungradable is those that represent an extreme degree of some property, such as delicious and terrified.

==== Phrases ====
An adjective phrase is a group of words that plays the role of an adjective in a sentence. It usually has a single adjective as its head, to which modifiers and complements may be added.

Adjectives can be modified by a preceding adverb or adverb phrase, as in very warm, truly imposing, more than a little excited. Some can also be preceded by a noun or quantitative phrase, as in fat-free, two-meter-long.

Complements following the adjective may include:

- prepositional phrases: proud of him, angry at the screen, keen on breeding toads;
- infinitive phrases: anxious to solve the problem, easy to pick up;
- content clauses, i.e. that clauses and certain others: certain that he was right, unsure where they are;
- after comparatives, phrases or clauses with than: better than you, smaller than I had imagined.

An adjective phrase may include both modifiers before the adjective and a complement after it, as in very difficult to put away.

Adjective phrases containing complements after the adjective cannot normally be used as attributive adjectives before a noun. Sometimes they are used attributively after the noun, as in a woman proud of being a midwife (where they may be converted into relative clauses: a woman who is proud of being a midwife), but it is wrong to say *a proud of being a midwife woman. Exceptions include very brief and often established phrases such as easy-to-use. (Certain complements can be moved to after the noun, leaving the adjective before the noun, as in a better man than you, a hard nut to crack.)

Certain attributive adjective phrases are formed from other parts of speech, without any adjective as their head, as in a two-bedroom house, a no-jeans policy.

=== Adverbs ===
Adverbs perform a wide range of functions. They typically modify verbs (or verb phrases), adjectives (or adjectival phrases), or other adverbs (or adverbial phrases). However, adverbs also sometimes qualify noun phrases (only the boss; quite a lovely place), pronouns and determiners (almost all), prepositional phrases (halfway through the movie), or whole sentences, to provide contextual comment or indicate an attitude (Frankly, I don't believe you). They can also indicate a relationship between clauses or sentences (He died, and consequently I inherited the estate).

Many English adverbs are formed from adjectives by adding the ending -ly, as in hopefully, widely, theoretically (for details of spelling and etymology, see -ly). Certain words can be used as both adjectives and adverbs, such as fast, straight, and hard; these are flat adverbs. In earlier usage more flat adverbs were accepted in formal usage; many of these survive in idioms and colloquially. (That's just plain ugly.) Some adjectives can also be used as flat adverbs when they actually describe the subject. (The streaker ran naked, not The streaker ran nakedly.) The adverb corresponding to the adjective good is well (note that bad forms the regular badly, although ill is occasionally used in some phrases).

There are also many adverbs that are not derived from adjectives, including adverbs of time, of frequency, of place, of degree and with other meanings. Some suffixes that are commonly used to form adverbs from nouns are -ward[s] (as in homeward[s]) and -wise (as in lengthwise).

Adverbs are also formed by adding -ly to the participles. For example, according, a present participle adjective, becomes accordingly, an adverb, by adding -ly after it. The past participle adjective repeated becomes repeatedly by adding -ly after it.

Most adverbs form comparatives and superlatives by modification with more and most: often, more often, most often; smoothly, more smoothly, most smoothly (see also comparison of adjectives, above). However, a few adverbs retain irregular inflection for comparative and superlative forms: much, more, most; a little, less, least; well, better, best; badly, worse, worst; far, further (farther), furthest (farthest); or follow the regular adjectival inflection: fast, faster, fastest; soon, sooner, soonest; etc.

Adverbs indicating the manner of an action are generally placed after the verb and its objects (We considered the proposal carefully), although other positions are often possible (We carefully considered the proposal). Many adverbs of frequency, degree, certainty, etc. (such as often, always, almost, probably, and various others such as just) tend to be placed before the verb (they usually have chips), although if there is an auxiliary or other "special verb" (see § Verbs above), then the normal position for such adverbs is after that special verb (or after the first of them, if there is more than one): I have just finished the crossword; She can usually manage a pint; We are never late; You might possibly have been unconscious. Adverbs that provide a connection with previous information (such as next, then, however), and those that provide the context (such as time or place) for a sentence, are typically placed at the start of the sentence: Yesterday we went on a shopping expedition. If the verb has an object, the adverb comes after the object (He finished the test quickly). When there is more than one type of adverb, they usually appear in the order: manner, place, time (His arm was hurt severely at home yesterday).

A special type of adverb is the adverbial particle used to form phrasal verbs (such as up in pick up, on in get on, etc.) If such a verb also has an object, then the particle may precede or follow the object, although it will normally follow the object if the object is a pronoun (pick the pen up or pick up the pen, but pick it up).

==== Phrases ====
An adverb phrase is a phrase that acts as an adverb within a sentence. An adverb phrase may have an adverb as its head, together with any modifiers (other adverbs or adverb phrases) and complements, analogously to the adjective phrases described above. For example: very sleepily; all too suddenly; oddly enough; perhaps shockingly for us.

Another very common type of adverb phrase is the prepositional phrase, which consists of a preposition and its object: in the pool; after two years; for the sake of harmony.

=== Prepositions ===
Prepositions form a closed word class, although there are also certain phrases that serve as prepositions, such as in front of. A single preposition may have a variety of meanings, often including temporal, spatial and abstract. Many words that are prepositions can also serve as adverbs. Examples of common English prepositions (including phrasal instances) are: of, in, on, over, under, to, from, with, in front of, behind, opposite, by, before, after, during, through, in spite of or despite, between, among, etc.

A preposition is usually used with a noun phrase as its complement. A preposition together with its complement is called a prepositional phrase. Examples are in England, under the table, after six pleasant weeks, between the land and the sea. A prepositional phrase can be used as a complement or post-modifier of a noun in a noun phrase, as in the man in the car, the start of the fight; as a complement of a verb or adjective, as in deal with the problem, proud of oneself; or generally as an adverb phrase (see above).

English allows the use of "stranded" prepositions. This can occur in interrogative and relative clauses, where the interrogative or relative pronoun that is the preposition's complement is moved to the start (fronted), leaving the preposition in place. This kind of structure is avoided in some kinds of formal English. For example:

- What are you talking about? (Possible alternative version: About what are you talking?)
- The song that you were listening to ... (more formal: The song to which you were listening ...)

Notice that in the second example the relative pronoun that could be omitted.

Stranded prepositions can also arise in passive voice constructions and other uses of passive past participial phrases, where the complement in a prepositional phrase can become zero in the same way that a verb's direct object would: it was looked at; I will be operated on; get your teeth seen to. The same can happen in certain uses of infinitive phrases: he is nice to talk to; this is the page to make copies of.

=== Conjunctions ===
Conjunctions express a variety of logical relations between items, phrases, clauses and sentences. They help link ideas, show relationships, and form more complex sentences.

The principal coordinating conjunctions in English are: and, or, but, nor, so, yet, and for. These can be used in many grammatical contexts to link two or more items of equal grammatical status, for example:

- Noun phrases combined into a longer noun phrase, such as John, Eric, and Jill, the red coat or the blue one. When and is used, the resulting noun phrase is plural. A determiner does not need to be repeated with the individual elements: the cat, the dog, and the mouse and the cat, dog, and mouse are both correct. The same applies to other modifiers. (The word but can be used here in the sense of "except": nobody but you.)
- Adjective or adverb phrases combined into a longer adjective or adverb phrase: tired but happy, over the fields and far away.
- Verbs or verb phrases combined as in he washed, peeled, and diced the turnips (verbs conjoined, object shared); he washed the turnips, peeled them, and diced them (full verb phrases, including objects, conjoined).
- Other equivalent items linked, such as prefixes linked in pre- and post-test counselling, numerals as in two or three buildings, etc.
- Clauses or sentences linked, as in We came, but they wouldn't let us in. They wouldn't let us in, nor would they explain what we had done wrong.

Another example of clauses or sentences linked is: I like reading books, and I also enjoy watching movies.

There are also correlative conjunctions, where as well as the basic conjunction, an additional element appears before the first of the items being linked. The common correlatives in English are:

- either ... or ... (either a man or a woman);
- neither ... nor ... (neither clever nor funny);
- both ... and ... (they both punished and rewarded them);
- not ... but ..., particularly in not only ... but also ... (not exhausted but exhilarated, not only football but also many other sports).

An example of a correlative conjunction can be seen in: Not only did I finish my homework, but I also helped my sibling.

Subordinators make relations between clauses, making the clause in which they appear into a subordinate clause. Some common subordinators in English are:

- conjunctions of time, including after, before, since, until, when, while;
- conjunctions of cause and effect, including because, since, now that, as, in order that, so;
- conjunctions of opposition or concession, such as although, though, even though, whereas, while;
- conjunctions of condition: such as if, unless, only if, whether or not, even if, in case (that);
- the conjunction that, which produces content clauses, as well as words that produce interrogative content clauses: whether, where, when, how, etc.

Subordinating conjunction generally comes at the very start of its clause, although many of them can be preceded by qualifying adverbs, as in probably because ..., especially if .... The conjunction that can be omitted after certain verbs, as in she told us (that) she was ready. (For the use of that in relative clauses, see § Relative pronouns above.)

An example of a subordinating conjunction being used is: I went to the store because I needed milk.

=== Case ===
Although English has largely lost its case system, personal pronouns still have three morphological cases that are simplified forms of the nominative, objective and genitive cases:

- The nominative case (subjective pronouns such as I, he, she, we, they, who, whoever), used for the subject of a finite verb and sometimes for the complement of a copula.
- The oblique case (object pronouns such as me, him, her, it, us, them, whom, whomever), used for the direct or indirect object of a verb, for the object of a preposition, for an absolute disjunct, and sometimes for the complement of a copula.
- The genitive case (possessive pronouns such as my/mine, his, her(s), its, our(s), their(s), whose), used for a grammatical possessor. This is not always considered to be a case; see English possessive § Status of the possessive as a grammatical case.

Most English personal pronouns have five forms: the nominative and oblique case forms, the possessive case, which has both a determiner form (such as my, our) and a distinct independent form (such as mine, ours) (with two exceptions: the third person singular masculine and the third person singular neuter it, which use the same form for both determiner and independent [his car, it is his]), and a distinct reflexive or intensive form (such as myself, ourselves). The interrogative personal pronoun who exhibits the greatest diversity of forms within the modern English pronoun system, having definite nominative, oblique, and genitive forms (who, whom, whose) and equivalently coordinating indefinite forms (whoever, whomever, and whosever).

Forms such as I, he, and we are used for the subject ("I kicked the ball"), whereas forms such as me, him and us are used for the object ("John kicked me").

=== Declension ===
Nouns have distinct singular and plural forms; that is, they decline to reflect their grammatical number; consider the difference between book and books. In addition, a few English pronouns have distinct nominative (also called subjective) and oblique (or objective) forms; that is, they decline to reflect their relationship to a verb or preposition, or case. Consider the difference between he (subjective) and him (objective), as in "He saw it" and "It saw him"; similarly, consider who, which is subjective, and the objective whom. Further, these pronouns and a few others have distinct possessive forms, such as his and whose. By contrast, nouns have no distinct nominative and objective forms, the two being merged into a single plain case. For example, chair does not change form between "the chair is here" (subject) and "I saw the chair" (direct object). Possession is shown by the clitic -'s attached to a possessive noun phrase, rather than by declension of the noun itself.

== Negation ==
As noted above under § Verbs, a finite indicative verb (or its clause) is negated by placing the word not after an auxiliary, modal or other "special" verb such as do, can or be. For example, the clause I go is negated with the appearance of the auxiliary do, as I do not go (see do-support). When the affirmative already uses auxiliary verbs (I am going), no other auxiliary verbs are added to negate the clause (I am not going). (Until the period of early Modern English, negation was effected without additional auxiliary verbs: I go not.)

Most combinations of auxiliary verbs etc. with not have contracted forms: don't, can't, isn't, etc. (Also the uncontracted negated form of can is written as a single word cannot.) On the inversion of subject and verb (such as in questions; see below), the subject may be placed after a contracted negated form: Should he not pay? or Shouldn't he pay?

Other elements, such as noun phrases, adjectives, adverbs, infinitive and participial phrases, etc., can be negated by placing the word not before them: not the right answer, not interesting, not to enter, not noticing the train, etc.

When other negating words such as never, nobody, etc. appear in a sentence, the negating not is omitted (unlike its equivalents in many languages): I saw nothing or I didn't see anything, but not (except in non-standard speech) *I didn't see nothing (see Double negative). Such negating words generally have corresponding negative polarity items (ever for never, anybody for nobody, etc.) which can appear in a negative context but are not negative themselves (and can thus be used after a negation without giving rise to double negatives).

== Clause and sentence structure ==
A typical sentence contains one independent clause and possibly one or more dependent clauses, although it is also possible to link together sentences of this form into longer sentences, using coordinating conjunctions (see above). A clause typically contains a subject (a noun phrase) and a predicate (a verb phrase in the terminology used above; that is, a verb together with its objects and complements). A dependent clause also normally contains a subordinating conjunction (or in the case of relative clauses, a relative pronoun, or phrase containing one).

=== Word order ===
English word order has moved from the Germanic verb-second (V2) word order to being almost exclusively subject–verb–object (SVO). The combination of SVO order and use of auxiliary verbs often creates clusters of two or more verbs at the center of the sentence, such as he had hoped to try to open it. In most sentences, English marks grammatical relations only through word order. The subject constituent precedes the verb and the object constituent follows it. The Object–subject–verb (OSV) may on occasion be seen in English, usually in the future tense or used as a contrast with the conjunction "but", such as in the following examples: "Rome I shall see!", "I hate oranges, but apples I'll eat!".

=== Questions ===
Like many other Western European languages, English historically allowed questions to be formed by inverting the positions of the verb and subject. Modern English permits this only in the case of a small class of verbs ("special verbs"), consisting of auxiliaries as well as forms of the copula be (see subject–auxiliary inversion). To form a question from a sentence which does not have such an auxiliary or copula present, the auxiliary verb do (does, did) needs to be inserted, along with inversion of the word order, to form a question (see do-support). For example:

- She can dance. → Can she dance? (inversion of subject she and auxiliary can)
- I am sitting here. → Am I sitting here? (inversion of subject I and copula am)
- The milk goes in the refrigerator. → Does the milk go in the refrigerator? (no special verb present; do-support required)

The above concerns yes–no questions, but inversion also takes place in the same way after other questions, formed with interrogative words such as where, what, how, etc. An exception applies when the interrogative word is the subject or part of the subject, in which case there is no inversion. For example:

- I go. → Where do I go? (wh-question formed using inversion, with do-support required in this case)
- He goes. → Who goes? (no inversion, because the question word who is the subject)

Inversion does not apply in indirect questions: I wonder where he is (not *... where is he). Indirect yes–no questions can be expressed using if or whether as the interrogative word: Ask them whether/if they saw him.

Negative questions are formed similarly; however, if the verb undergoing inversion has a contraction with not, then it is possible to invert the subject with this contraction as a whole. For example:

- John is going. (affirmative)
- John is not going. / John isn't going. (negative, with and without contraction)
- Isn't John going? / Is John not going? (negative question, with and without contraction respectively)

See also English auxiliaries and contractions § Contractions and inversion.

=== Dependent clauses ===
The syntax of a dependent clause is generally the same as that of an independent clause, except that the dependent clause usually begins with a subordinating conjunction or relative pronoun (or phrase containing such). In some situations (as already described) the conjunction or relative pronoun that can be omitted. Another type of dependent clause with no subordinating conjunction is the conditional clause formed by inversion (see below).

=== Other uses of inversion ===
The clause structure with an inverted subject and verb, used to form questions as described above, is also used in certain types of declarative sentences. This occurs mainly when the sentence begins with adverbial or other phrases that are essentially negative or contain words such as only, hardly, etc.: Never have I known someone so stupid; Only in France can such food be tasted.

In elliptical sentences (see below), inversion takes place after so (meaning "also") as well as after the negative neither: so do I, neither does she.

Inversion can also be used to form conditional clauses, beginning with should, were (subjunctive), or had, in the following ways:

- should I win the race (equivalent to if I should win the race);
- were he a soldier (equivalent to if he were a soldier);
- were he to win the race (equivalent to if he were to win the race, i.e. if he won the race);
- had he won the race (equivalent to if he had won the race).

Other similar forms sometimes appear but are less common. There is also a construction with subjunctive be, as in be he alive or dead (meaning "no matter whether he is alive or dead").

Use of inversion to express a third-person imperative is now mostly confined to the expression long live X, meaning "let X live long".

=== Imperatives ===
In an imperative sentence (one giving an order), there is usually no subject in the independent clause: Go away until I call you. It is possible, however, to include you as the subject for emphasis: You stay away from me.

=== Elliptical constructions ===
Many types of elliptical construction are possible in English, resulting in sentences that omit certain redundant elements. Various examples are given in the article on Ellipsis.

Some notable elliptical forms found in English include:

- Short statements of the form I can, he isn't, we mustn't. Here the verb phrase (understood from the context) is reduced to a single auxiliary or other "special" verb, negated if appropriate. If there is no special verb in the original verb phrase, it is replaced by do/does/did: he does, they didn't.
- Clauses that omit the verb, in particular those like me too, nor me, me neither. The latter forms are used after negative statements. (Equivalents including the verb: I do too or so do I; I don't either or neither do I.)
- Tag questions, formed with a special verb and pronoun subject: isn't it?; were there?; am I not?

== History of English grammars ==
The first published English grammar was a Pamphlet for Grammar of 1586, written by William Bullokar with the stated goal of demonstrating that English was just as rule-based as Latin. Bullokar's grammar was faithfully modeled on William Lily's Latin grammar, Rudimenta Grammatices (1534), used in English schools at that time, having been "prescribed" for them in 1542 by Henry VIII. Bullokar wrote his grammar in English and used a "reformed spelling system" of his own invention; but much English grammar, for much of the century after Bullokar's effort, was written in Latin, especially by authors who were aiming to be scholarly. John Wallis's Grammatica Linguae Anglicanae (1685) was the last English grammar written in Latin.

Even as late as the early 19th century, Lindley Murray, the author of one of the most widely used grammars of the day, was having to cite "grammatical authorities" to bolster the claim that grammatical cases in English are different from those in Ancient Greek or Latin.

English parts of speech are based on Latin and Greek parts of speech. Some English grammar rules were adopted from Latin, for example John Dryden is thought to have created the rule no sentences can end in a preposition because Latin cannot end sentences in prepositions. The rule of no split infinitives was adopted from Latin because Latin has no split infinitives.

== See also ==
- English usage controversies
- English prefixes
- Subject–object–verb
- Grammar
