= Generic antecedent =

Representatives of classes in a situation in which gender is typically unknown

Generic antecedents are representatives of classes, referred to in ordinary language by another word (most often a pronoun), in a situation in which gender is typically unknown or irrelevant. These mostly arise in generalizations and are particularly common in abstract, theoretical or strategic discourse. Examples (with the antecedent in boldface and the referring pronoun in italics) include "readers of Wikipedia appreciate their encyclopedia", "the customer who spends in this market".

The question of appropriate style for using pronouns to refer to such generic antecedents in the English language became politicized in the 1970s, and remains a matter of substantial dispute.

== Treatment in various languages ==
Many languages share the following issue with English: the generic antecedent is a representative individual of a class, whose gender is unknown or irrelevant, but pronouns are gender-specific. In languages such as English that distinguish natural gender in pronouns but not grammatical gender in nouns, normally masculine, but sometimes feminine, forms of pronouns are used for the generic reference, in what is called the generic usage of the pronoun. The context makes the generic intent of the usage clear in communication.

- Example: An **ambitious academic** will publish as soon as **she** can.

Unless there is reason to believe the speaker thinks ambitious academics are always female in the relevant context, the use of she in this sentence must be interpreted as a generic use. Traditionally both he and they were used for this purpose but, particularly since the nineteenth century, English style guides have frequently recommended the otherwise masculine he as a singular generic pronoun. Since the middle of the twentieth century the use of he for this purpose has been discouraged, partly because use of he is perceived as subtly biasing the listener to assume the antecedent is masculine. Various alternatives have been proposed, including the ubiquitous but controversial singular they.

=== French ===
In French both the singular and plural pronouns in the third person are marked for grammatical gender, and the antecedent always has grammatical gender. The masculine form of "they", ils, is always used when referring to a plural and grammatically masculine antecedent, while for plural antecedents that are grammatically feminine the feminine form elles of "they" is used. Likewise, in the singular the third person pronoun il is used to refer to grammatically masculine antecedents and elle is used to refer to grammatically feminine antecedents. Thus, for both generic and non-generic antecedents, the natural gender of the antecedent, whether known or unknown, is irrelevant, as the deciding factor for the choice of a referring pronoun is the grammatical gender of the antecedent.

Some French speakers advocate the use of created gender-free pronouns, such as illes or els for ils et elles ("they (masculine) and they (feminine)") and celleux or ceulles for celles et ceux ("those (feminine) and those (masculine)").

=== Mandarin Chinese ===
In spoken Mandarin Chinese, and in the pinyin form of writing Mandarin in the Latin alphabet, there is no distinction between "he" and "she" (tā in each case), nor is there a distinction between "they (masculine)" and "they (feminine)" (tāmen in each case). However, when Mandarin is written in characters, a gender distinction is made: tā is written as 他 or 她 for "he" or "she" respectively, with -men (们) added for the plural. For a plural generic antecedent such as "people (in general)", the referring pronoun will always be written as the masculine plural form unless the generic group is known to be inherently female (as in "women (in general)"), in which case the feminine form is used. For a singular generic antecedent such as "someone", the referring pronoun is always written as the masculine singular form unless the generic antecedent is known to be inherently female (as in "(an unspecified) woman").

== Gender in English pronouns ==
If an antecedent is a thing, either specific or generic (such as a snowman), rather than a person, the appropriate pronoun to refer back to it is it, and no difficulty arises. Likewise, if the antecedent is more than one thing, again either specific or generic, the pronoun they is used to refer back to it, and again no difficulty arises.

When the antecedent is a specific person (whose gender is therefore known), the correct referring pronoun is either he or she, depending on the person's gender. When the antecedent is a specific group of two or more people, the pronoun they is used, again without any difficulty arising. And when the antecedent is generic and plural, again the pronoun they is used and is not problematic, because they is not gender-specific.

But difficulty arises in choosing a singular pronoun to refer to a single, unspecified human (whose gender is indeterminate, as the reference is equally to a hypothetical male or a hypothetical female). In particular, the overlap of generic use with gender role stereotyping has led to controversy in English.

- A **nurse** should ensure that **she** gets adequate rest.
- A **police officer** should maintain **his** fitness.
- A **dancer** should watch **her** diet carefully.
- A **boss** should treat **his** staff well.

In these examples, some speakers might mean that all nurses are female, or that all bosses are male, while others might intend the pronouns as generic and hence gender-unspecific. Ambiguity arises from the possibility that the listener might interpret the meaning differently from what the speaker intended.

== Approaches taken in English ==
Speakers of all languages use words both to make distinctions and to generalize:

- Example of distinction: My **mother** thinks..., but my **father** says....
- Example of generalization: **Parents** believe....
- Example of generalization: **Any** [or **Every**] **parent** believes....

What has become controversial among users of English is the choice of pronoun to refer back to a generalized, and hence generic, singular antecedent such as any parent, or every parent. Examples of accepted, disputed, and impossible constructions in English include:

- **All** people get hungry, so **they** eat. **Acceptable** (All people is plural.)
- **All** people get hungry, so **she** eats. **Incorrect** if all people is the intended antecedent of she (singular pronoun cannot have a plural antecedent.)
- **Each** one gets thirsty, so **he** drinks. **Disputed** (Is he generic, or are all members of the group male?)
- **Each** one gets thirsty, so **they** drink. **Acceptable** Long in use (by Shakespeare, for example); condemned by some older sources, such as The Elements of Style, but endorsed by many modern style guides.
- **Each** one gets thirsty, so **he or she** drinks. **Awkward** (especially if used repeatedly) and recommended against by the Chicago Manual of Style, et al.
- When **a person** is tired, **she** sleeps. **Disputed** (Is she specific or generic?)

English guidelines before the 1980s supported the use of he as a singular pronoun that can refer to both men and women (generic usage). Use of the generic he, however, has been decreasing since the 1960s.

Many recent style guides discourage generic constructions or accept approaches other than the generic he. Some writers prefer to alternate between male and female generic usage to provide clarity without the appearance of bias. Other speakers intentionally use female generic forms as a political or cultural statement against the conventional practice of generic use of the masculine form. A study of English language usage over the past twenty years shows that they is now the most common way that modern speakers and writers refer back to generic antecedents.

=== Modern solutions ===
Speakers opposed to gender role stereotyping often use one of the following strategies.

- A **boss** should treat **her** staff well. (Use of the pronoun opposite to expected gender)
- **Bosses** should treat **their** staff well. (Making the antecedent plural, thus requiring the use of a plural pronoun, which in English is not gender-specific)
- A **boss** should treat **their** staff well. (Use of singular they, incorrect in formal English according to some sources, especially older or traditional ones, but accepted by others).
- A **boss** should treat **eir** staff well. (Rare use of a Spivak pronoun; also see gender-neutral pronoun.)

There is historical precedent for the third option as well as popular contemporary usage. However, there are contemporary, as well as historical, style guides that discourage this option. In 2000, the Usage Panel of The American Heritage Dictionary wrote:

Most of the Usage Panelists reject the use of they with singular antecedents. Eighty-two percent find the sentence The typical student in the program takes about six years to complete their course work unacceptable. … Panel members do seem to distinguish between singular nouns, such as the typical student, and pronouns that are grammatically singular but semantically plural, such as anyone and everyone.

By their 2022 update, the dictionary reported "their resistance has declined over time":

Resistance remains strongest when the sentence refers to a specific individual whose gender is unknown, rather than to a generic individual representative of anyone: in our 2015 survey, 58 percent of the Panel found We thank the anonymous reviewer for their helpful comments unacceptable. A sentence with a generic antecedent, A person at that level should not have to keep track of the hours they put in, was rejected by 48 percent (a substantial change from our 1996 survey, in which 80 percent rejected this same sentence).

=== Other alternatives ===
Options other than generic pronouns, rephrasing in the plural, or using they can be well suited to some contexts, but problematic in others.

- A boss should treat **her or his** staff well. (Issues: cumbersome if overused, have to place genders in an order.)
- If **(s)he** does, it is good. (Issue: written option only.)
- **Thon** will be happy and so will they. (Issue: none of the invented pronouns – thon, xe, and many others – have been accepted into the language.)

The indefinite personal pronoun, one, is suitably singular and unspecific with respect to gender; but it can take only "one" as an antecedent.

- **One** takes care of **one's** own.

=== Opinions ===
Some modern prescriptivists argue from the valid use of they in certain contexts, to making it valid or even mandatory in all. Other prescriptivists argue that generic he should be proscribed. Both these points of view have found many followers; however, they generally do not accurately describe the usage or rationale of the wide range of options common in the English language.

The reforms involving gender are explicitly political in intent and represent a quest for social justice rather than a wish for more consistent logic. And unlike other political language reforms, which tend to be limited to individual names for ethnic groups, gender reforms involve basic grammatical components like pronouns, basic grammatical rules like pronoun agreement, and basic words like man, father, male and female. Some of these elements have been in the language for over a thousand years. It is not surprising, therefore, that the effort to undo them can often be a difficult and untidy business.

== See also ==
- Donkey sentence – Sentence that resists simple formalization
- Epicenity – Quality of a word with identical female and male forms
- Gnomic aspect, also known as generic mood – Grammatical feature used to express general truths or aphorisms
- Generic you – Use of the pronoun you to refer to an unspecified person
- Indefinite pronoun – Pronoun without a definite referent
- Markedness – State of standing out as unusual or difficult in comparison to a more common or regular form
- Quantificational variability effect
- Singular they – Gender-neutral English pronoun
- Third-person pronoun – Pronoun that is associated with a particular grammatical person
