= French verb morphology =

Aspect of French verbs

In French, a verb is inflected to reflect its mood and tense, as well as to agree with its subject in person and number. Following the tradition of Latin grammar, the set of inflected forms of a French verb is called the verb's conjugation.

== Stems and endings ==
French verbs have a large number of simple (one-word) forms. These are composed of two distinct parts: the stem (or root, or radix), which indicates which verb it is, and the ending (inflection), which indicates the verb's tense (imperfect, present, future etc.) and mood and its subject's person (I, you, he/she etc.) and number, though many endings can correspond to multiple tense-mood-subject combinations. In certain parts of the second conjugation there is also a suffix -iss- between the stem and the ending, which derives historically from an inchoative suffix.

- In parlaient, the stem parl- indicates that the verb is parler (to speak) and the ending -aient marks the third-person plural imperfect indicative. "Third person plural" meaning the subject of the verb is "they". The "imperfect indicative" being a tense.
- In finissons, the stem fin- indicates that the verb is finir (to finish), the suffix -iss- follows it, and the inflection -ons marks the first-person plural present indicative or imperative. The "first-person plural" is the "we" form of a verb. The "present indicative" being a tense and "imperative" being a mood, but in French they are indistinguishable without context.

These verb conjugations are most often coupled with a subject pronoun to reinforce who the subject of the verb is (i.e. who is doing the action). Note that it is sometimes difficult to distinguish the stem from the ending, especially in irregular verbs such as avoir (to have), aller (to go), dire (to say), être (to be), faire (to do, make), pouvoir (can), savoir (to know), valoir (to be worth, to cost), and vouloir (to want):

- Il va travailler. (He goes to work.)
- Es-tu là ? (Are you there?)
- Elle a rougi. (She blushed.)

In these examples, there is no obvious stem – the verbs conjugate without a stem.

=== The principle of the fixed stem ===
The stem normally stays fixed in the first two conjugations:

- Parler: Je parlerais, tu parlas, qu'ils parlassent, que nous parlions, parlez...
- Finir: Je finirais, vous finîtes, qu'ils finissent, finis, que nous finissions...

In the third it is often modified, sometimes even between persons in the same tense:

- Vouloir: Je veux, tu veux, il veut, nous voulons, vous voulez, ils veulent.

But such irregularities apart, the principle is that nothing is removed from the stem. Consequently, verbs ending in -guer and -quer keep the -gu- or -qu- throughout the conjugation, even where simplifying this combination to -g- or -c- would be consistent with the rules of French orthography:

- Naviguer: nous naviguons, je naviguais, en naviguant...
- Provoquer: nous provoquons, je provoquais, en provoquant...

=== Adding to the stem to preserve the pronunciation ===
But although things are generally not removed from the stem, it is permissible to add letters when this is necessary. Certain stems can undergo various orthographic changes (which are not strictly speaking considered to be irregularities) in order to retain the correct pronunciation:

- The -c- in certain stems receives a cedilla before any ending which would otherwise change its pronunciation:

Avancer: j'avance, nous avançons, j'avançais…
Apercevoir: j'aperçois, tu aperçus, nous apercevons…

- The -g- in certain stems is followed by a silent -e- before any ending which would otherwise change its pronunciation:

Manger: je mange, nous mangeons, je mangeais, vous mangiez, en mangeant…

=== Endings (terminaisons) ===
The ending is a suffix which tells us:

- For all verbs, the mood and the tense;
- For finite verbs, the person and the number; and
- For the past participle alone, the gender and the number.

Apart from a few frequent verbs which are considered totally irregular (mainly avoir, être, aller and faire), for each tense of each mood a series of six endings (one for each person singular and plural) is associated with a group or subgroup of verbs. Each of these series must now remain fixed throughout a single tense. Consequently, no ending may be modified even when orthographical simplification would be possible:

- For example, when the verb stem ends in a vowel (crier, fuir, tuer, voir, etc.), the -e- of the ending may become silent but must still be written (in the present, future, and conditional):

Fuir (to flee), present subjunctive: que je fuie, que tu fuies, qu'il fuie, que nous fuyions, que vous fuyiez, qu'ils fuient…
Créer (to create), future indicative: je créerai, tu créeras, il créera, nous créerons, vous créerez, ils créeront…

- Similarly, the imperfect indicative and present subjunctive endings for the first and second persons plural are -ions and -iez: for verbs such as gagner, voir, rire, briller, etc., the -i- of these endings must be retained, even though some speakers pronounce them the same way as the present indicative forms without -i-:

Nous gagnions (vs. gagnons), vous voyiez (vs. voyez), nous riions (vs. rions), vous brilliez (vs. brillez), …

== Formation of simple tenses active ==
These tenses are not formed with an auxiliary, and their formation is discussed in the following section.

=== Infinitive (Infinitif) ===
A verb is normally named by its present infinitive (Infinitif présent). Starting from this infinitive, the conjugations can be classified into three different groups:

- The first group or first conjugation. This contains the verbs with infinitives ending in -er /e/ (with the exception of aller, which due to its numerous irregularities is usually classed as being in the third conjugation):

Aimer, balayer, chanter, envoyer, fermer, manger, passer, payer, promener, regarder, etc.

For example, for the verb parler, the stem is parl- and the ending is -er /e/.

- The second group or second conjugation. This contains the verbs with infinitives ending in -ir /iʀ/ whose present participle ends in -issant /isɑ̃/:

Bénir, compatir, déguerpir, fleurir, grandir, haïr, investir, polir, rougir, rugir, salir, etc.

For example, for the verb finir, the stem is fin- and the ending is -ir.

- The third group or third conjugation. This contains all the other verbs, all considered as to some extent irregular, to wit: the verbs ending in -ir not belonging to the second conjugation, the verbs ending in -oir, the verbs ending in -re, and the verb aller:

Conduire, connaître, dire, dormir, exclure, faire, mettre, plaindre, prendre, résoudre, savoir, vivre, etc.

Examples:

courir – the stem is cour- and the ending is -ir /iʁ/.
devoir – the stem is dev- and the ending is -oir /waʁ/.
rendre – the stem is rend- and the ending is -re /ʁ/.
aller – the stem is all- and the ending is -er /e/.

Note that the auxiliaries être and avoir, although they would naturally seem to belong to the third conjugation, are traditionally classed separately.

=== Present indicative (Indicatif présent) ===
The present indicative is the form of the verb used to describe an action in the present e.g. Je parle means "I speak" or "I am speaking".

The stem of the present indicative is not always regular and can vary (especially in the third conjugation) and there are three main sets of endings:

- Verbs ending in -er (all verbs of the first group): -e, -es, -e, -ons, -ez, -ent, pronounced /ᵊ, ᵊ, ᵊ, ˈɔ̃, ˈe, ᵊ/.
- Verbs ending in -ir (all verbs of the second group and most of the third): -is, -is, -it, -issons, -issez, -issent, pronounced /ˈi, ˈi, ˈi, isˈɔ̃, isˈe, ˈis/. But there are numerous irregularities, especially in the third group.
- Verbs ending in -re (part of the third group): -s, -s, - , -ons, -ez, -ent, pronounced /, , , ˈɔ̃, ˈe, /.
- Example:

		1st group	2nd group	3rd group
		Parler (to speak)	Finir (to finish)	Descendre (to go/get down)
1st person	singular	je parle	je finis	je descends
1st person	plural	nous parlons	nous finissons	nous descendons
2nd person	singular	tu parles	tu finis	tu descends
2nd person	plural	vous parlez	vous finissez	vous descendez
3rd person	singular	il/elle/on parle	il/elle/on finit	il/elle/on descend
3rd person	Plural	ils/elles parlent	ils/elles finissent	ils/elles descendent

- Verbs of the second group take an -iss- in the plural conjugations.
- Verbs of the third group:
  - Verbs ending in -oir : the indicative present stems depend on the verb. The endings are -s, -s, -t, -ons, -ez, -ent. However, verbs pouvoir, valoir, équivaloir and vouloir have -x, -x, -t in singular (je peux, tu peux, je (j'équi)vaux, tu (équi)vaux, je veux, tu veux).
  - Verbs in -re : endings are the same, stems are equally irregular. There are verbs dire, faire and être which have -tes instead of -ez and other irregularities. Verbs with -ttre have -ts, -ts, -t in singular (je mets for mettre, tu bats for battre). Verbs with -dre have endings -ds, -ds, -d in singular (e.g. : je prends, tu mouds, il répand) except verbs in -indre and -soudre (Verbs in -soudre in plural: -solvons, -solvez, -solvent). Verbs vaincre and convaincre have -cs, -cs, -c in singular (je (con)vaincs, tu (con)vaincs, il (con)vainc).
  - Verbs in -ir : endings are the same as the second group in singular, and they have regular ending of third group in plural.

=== Imperfect indicative (Indicatif imparfait) ===
The imperfect indicative is a past tense, where the action either continues into the present or is a repeated action e.g. "je parlais" means "I was speaking" or "I used to speak". It may be used when someone or their action is interrupted e.g. "je parlais avant que tu m'arrêtes" meaning "I was speaking before you stopped me"

- The stem of the imperfect indicative is always invariant for a single verb. It is derived from the first person plural of the present indicative (except for the verb être):

Verb boire, present indicative: je bois, tu bois, il boit, nous buvons, vous buvez, ils boivent.
Verb boire, imperfect indicative: je buvais, tu buvais, il buvait, nous buvions, vous buviez, ils buvaient.

- The endings of this tense are for any of the three groups always: -ais, -ais, -ait, -ions, -iez, -aient, pronounced /ɛ, ɛ, ɛ, jɔ̃, je, ɛ/.

For the 1st and 3rd groups, the -i- of the first and second persons plural must always be kept even though it may not be reflected in the pronunciation of certain verbs:

Nous travaillions, vous travailliez, nous riions, vous riiez, nous essuyions, vous essuyiez, nous gagnions, vous gagniez, nous tressaillions, vous tressailliez, nous priions, vous priiez...

- Example:

1st group	2nd group
je parlais	je finissais
tu parlais	tu finissais
il, elle, on parlait	il, elle, on finissait
nous parlions	nous finissions
vous parliez	vous finissiez
ils parlaient	ils, elles finissaient

- In older texts, one can find the endings -ois, -ois, -oit, -ions, -iez, -oient, corresponding to the orthography of Old French. This spelling coexisted with the modern endings -ais, -ais, -ait, -ions, -iez, -aient and was not officially abandoned by the Académie française until 1835.
- Example:

1st group	2nd group
je parlois	je finissois
tu parlois	tu finissois
il, elle, on parloit	il, elle, on finissoit
nous parlions	nous finissions
vous parliez	vous finissiez
ils parloient	ils, elles finissoient

- Verb être : the stem is ét- (/et/), endings are the same.

=== Past historic (Indicatif passé simple or Indicatif passé défini) ===
Note that in modern language this tense is used only in formal writing, usually referring to historical, historic events, or in novels; it was replaced by passé composé in other contexts. The stem of the past historic tense is not always regular but is always invariant for a single verb. There are four sets of endings for this tense:

- Past historic in -a-: -ai, -as, -a, -âmes, -âtes, -èrent. [1st group and aller]

(pronounced /e, a, a, ɑm, ɑt, ɛʀ/.)

- Past historic in -i-: -is, -is, -it, -îmes, -îtes, -irent. [2nd and 3rd groups]

(pronounced /i, i, i, im, it, iʀ/.)

- Past historic in -u-: -us, -us, -ut, -ûmes, -ûtes, -urent. [3rd group]

(pronounced /y, y, y, ym, yt, yʀ/.)

- Past historic in -in-: -ins, -ins, -int, -înmes, -întes, -inrent. [verbs venir, tenir and all the verbs which are formed with them (survenir, maintenir, etc.)]

(pronounced /ɛ̃, ɛ̃, ɛ̃, ɛ̃m, ɛ̃t, ɛ̃ʀ/.)

Je chantai, je finis, je bus, je vins…

- Example:

1st group	2nd group
je parlai	je finis
tu parlas	tu finis
il, elle, on parla	il, elle, on finit
nous parlâmes	nous finîmes
vous parlâtes	vous finîtes
ils, elles parlèrent	ils, elles finirent

=== Future (Indicatif futur simple) ===
The future endings correspond to the present indicative of the verb avoir. They are always regular: -ai, -as, -a, -ons, -ez, -ont, pronounced /e, a, a, ɔ̃, e, ɔ̃/.

- Between the future stem and these endings the infinitive ending is inserted, though the pronunciation of the -er infinitive changes from /e/ to /(ə)ʀ/ In other words, to form the future tense these endings are appended to the infinitive:

Je finirai, tu parleras, elle sortira, nous travaillerons, vous rougirez, ils partiront.

But there are several irregular future stems, especially in the third group.

- Example:

1st group	2nd group	3rd group
je parlerai	je finirai	je descendrai
tu parleras	tu finiras	tu descendras
il, elle, on parlera	il, elle, on finira	il, elle, on descendra
nous parlerons	nous finirons	nous descendrons
vous parlerez	vous finirez	vous descendrez
ils, elles parleront	ils, elles finiront	ils, elles descendront

The following verbs have a double r in future forms: envoyer, renvoyer (j'enverrai, je renverrai), mourir (je mourrai), courir (je courrai), choir and échoir (il cherra, il écherra), acquérir and conquérir (j'acquerrai, je conquerrai), voir (je verrai), pouvoir (je pourrai).

=== Present conditional (Conditionnel présent) ===
The conditional endings correspond to those of the imperfect indicative. They too are always regular: -ais, -ais, -ait, -ions, -iez, -aient, and in some rare cases, -it, pronounced /ɛ, ɛ, ɛ, jɔ̃, je, ɛ/...

- The conditional stem is always the same as the future stem:

Je finirais, tu parlerais, elle sortirait, nous travaillerions, vous rougiriez, ils partiraient.

Consequently, if the future stem is irregular, so will the conditional be, and vice versa. Moreover, if the future does not exist (defective verbs) neither will the conditional.

- Example:

1st group	2nd group	3rd group
je parlerais	je finirais	je descendrais
tu parlerais	tu finirais	tu descendrais
il, elle, on parlerait	il, elle, on finirait	il, elle, on descendrait
nous parlerions	nous finirions	nous descendrions
vous parleriez	vous finiriez	vous descendriez
ils, elles parleraient	ils, elles finiraient	ils, elles descendraient

Sometimes the past imperfect subjunctive is used to replace the present conditional. This form is called the present conditional second form (Conditionnel présent deuxième forme). In contrast the regular conditional is then called present conditional first form (Conditionnel présent première forme). This has become very unusual, only in sentences starting with Même si and the expression fût-ce this form is still used. The perfective tense (the past conditional second form (Conditionnel passé deuxième forme) is however used very often in literature.

- Example:

1st group	2nd group
je parlasse	je finisse
tu parlasses	tu finisses
il, elle, on parlât	il, elle, on finît
nous parlassions	nous finissions
vous parlassiez	vous finissiez
ils, elles parlassent	ils, elles finissent

=== Present subjunctive (Subjonctif présent) ===
- The present subjunctive endings are for all three groups (except the verbs être and avoir): -e, -es, -e, -ions, -iez, -ent, pronounced /ᵊ, ᵊ, ᵊ, jɔ̃, je, ᵊ/.

For the 1st and 3rd groups, the -i- of the first and second persons plural must always be kept even though it may not be reflected in the pronunciation of certain verbs:

(Il faut) que nous travaillions, que vous travailliez, que nous riions, que vous riiez, que nous essuyions, que vous essuyiez, que nous gagnions, que vous gagniez, que nous tressaillions, que vous tressailliez, que nous priions, que vous priiez. Exceptions: que nous ayons, que vous ayez, que nous soyons, que vous soyez...

- The present subjunctive stem is generally derived from the third person plural of the present indicative (except for the verbs aller, avoir, être, faire, falloir, pouvoir, savoir, traire, valoir, and vouloir, which have irregular stems):

Verb craindre, present indicative: je crains, tu crains, il craint, nous craignons, vous craignez, ils craignent.
Verb craindre, present subjunctive: (que) je craigne, tu craignes, il craigne, nous craignions, vous craigniez, ils craignent.
Verb faire, present indicative: je fais, tu fais, il fait, nous faisons, vous faites, ils font.
Verb faire, present subjunctive: (que) je fasse, tu fasses, il fasse, nous fassions, vous fassiez, ils fassent.

But sometimes when in the present indicative the stem used for the first and second persons plural differs from that used for the other four persons; the present subjunctive also uses this stem for these two persons:

Verb recevoir, present indicative: je reçois, tu reçois, il reçoit, nous recevons, vous recevez, ils reçoivent.
Verb recevoir, present subjunctive: (que) je reçoive, tu reçoives, il reçoive, nous recevions, vous receviez, ils reçoivent.

- Example:

1st group	2nd group
(il faut que) je parle	(il faut que) je finisse
(que) tu parles	(que) tu finisses
(qu') il, elle, on parle	(qu') il, elle, on finisse
(que) nous parlions	(que) nous finissions
(que) vous parliez	(que) vous finissiez
(qu') ils, elles parlent	(qu') ils, elles finissent

- Irregular endings : être(que je sois, que tu sois, qu'il soit, que nous soyons, que vous soyez, qu'il soient) and avoir (qu'il ait, que nous ayons, que vous ayez, the rest are regular)

=== Imperfect subjunctive (Subjonctif imparfait) ===
The imperfect subjunctive is always constructed from the past historic; hence, if the past historic does not exist (defective verbs) neither will the imperfect subjunctive. To be more exact, the imperfect subjunctive stem consists of the second person singular of the past historic, except that in the third person singular of the imperfect subjunctive the final -s- of the stem is replaced with a circumflex over the preceding vowel. The stem is otherwise stable for a single verb, and the endings are always: -se, -ses, -ˆt, -sions, -siez, -sent, pronounced /s, s, -, sjɔ̃, sje, s/.

(Il fallait) que je chantasse, que tu finisses, qu'il bût, que nous vinssions, que vous parlassiez, qu'elles rougissent…

- Example:

1st group	2nd group
(il faut que) je parlasse	(il faut que) je finisse
(que) tu parlasses	(que) tu finisses
(qu') il, elle, on parlât	(qu') il, elle, on finît
(que) nous parlassions	(que) nous finissions
(que) vous parlassiez	(que) vous finissiez
(qu') ils, elles parlassent	(qu') ils, elles finissent

=== Imperative (Impératif) ===
Recall two unusual features of the imperative: it exists only in three persons (second singular, first plural and second plural) and its subject pronoun is always omitted.

- Most often, the present imperative (Impératif présent) is copied from the indicative present (this is always true for verbs from the first two groups). Thus when the present indicative has two alternate forms, so does the present imperative:

Asseoir: assieds (assois), asseyons (assoyons), asseyez (assoyez).
Payer: paie (paye), payons, payez.

- The imperatives of avoir and être are based on the present subjunctive, and those of savoir and vouloir are irregular:

Aie, ayons, ayez.
Sois, soyons, soyez.
Sache, sachons, sachez.
Veuille, veuillons, veuillez.

- Note that the singular of verbs ending in -e or in -a in the imperative has no final -s. This applies to all verbs from the 1st group and to some from the 3rd (assaillir, couvrir, cueillir, défaillir, offrir, ouvrir, souffrir, tressaillir and verbs derived from them, as well as the verbs aller, avoir, savoir et vouloir):

Parle, cueille, va, aie, sache, veuille, finis, sors...

- However, for euphonic reasons this -s reappears if the imperative is immediately followed by one of the indirect object pronouns en and y:

Cueille (cueilles-en). Pense (penses-y)...

- Example:

-er verbs	-ir verbs	-re verbs
parle	finis	descends
parlons	finissons	descendons
parlez	finissez	descendez

=== Present participle and gerundive ===
The present participle (le participe présent) is typically formed from the first-person plural of the present indicative by replacing -ons with -ant. There are exceptions to this, as with avoir, être, and savoir (whose present participles are ayant, étant, and sachant, respectively), but in all cases the present participle ends in -ant.

The gerundive (le gérondif) consists of the preposition en together with the present participle; for example, the present participle of faire is faisant, so its gerundive is en faisant.

The present participle and the gerundive are both invariable; that is, they do not change form to agree with any other part of a sentence.

=== Past participle ===
Past participles, unlike present participles and gerundives, may be inflected to show gender and number by adding -e and -s, as with a normal adjective. Hence, "un fruit confit", "une poire confite", "des fruits confits", and "des poires confites." As they are passive participles, this inflection only occurs with transitive verbs, and with certain reflexive verbs.

The plain (masculine singular) form of a past participle may end in -é (1st group verbs, naître [né], être [été] and aller [allé]), -i (2nd group; sortir [sorti], partir [parti], etc.), -u (entendre [entendu], boire [bu], lire [lu], etc. and savoir [su], voir [vu], pouvoir [pu]), -is (mettre [mis], prendre [pris], etc.), -us (inclure [inclus] and reclure [reclus] and only these verbs), -it (maudire, [maudit], dire [dit], etc.),-t (verbs in -indre : peindre [peint]), -ert (ouvrir [ouvert], couvrir [couvert], offrir [offert] and souffrir [souffert]), or eu (avoir [eu]).

=== Verbal adjective (Adjectif verbal) ===
- For most verbs, the verbal adjective is nearly the same as the present participle, however the verbal adjectif is inflected as an adjective, e.g. le garçon sautant (the jumping boy), la fille sautante (the jumping girl), les garçons sautants (the jumping boys), les filles sautantes (the jumping girls). This is called the Present verbal adjective (Adjectif verbal présent). The past participle can act as the Past verbal adjective (Adjectif verbal passé) (e.g. la fille sauvée (the girl that has been rescued)).
- However some verbs are irregular, their verbal adjective slightly differs from their present participle (most of these irregular verbs have a verbal adjective ending on ent instead of ant). A relative construction is almost always preferred to the present verbal adjective (e.g. les garçons qui sautent preferred to les garçons sautants), especially when there is a risk of orthographic confusion in some irregular cases (e.g. adj. résident vs. verb. adj. résidant, pronounced exactly the same, with only a slightest distinction of meaning).

Irregular verbs:

  - Present Infinitive (Infinitif présent) - Verbal adjective (Adjectif verbal) - present participle (Participe présent) - Translation
  - adhérer - adhérent - adhérant - to adhere
  - affluer - affluent - affluant - to rush
  - coïncider - coïncident - coïncidant - to coincide
  - communiquer - communicant - communiquant - to communicate
  - confluer - confluent - confluant - to meet (for rivers)
  - convaincre - convaincant - convainquant - to persuade
  - converger - convergent - convergeant - to converge
  - déléguer - délégant - déléguant - to delegate
  - déterger - détergent - détergeant - to wash
  - différer - différent - différant - to differ
  - diverger - divergent - divergeant - to diverge
  - exceller - excellent - excellant - to excel
  - équivaloir - équivalent - équivalant - to equal
  - fatiguer - fatigant - fatiguant - to wear, to tire
  - influer - influent - influant - to affect
  - intriguer - intrigant - intriguant - to intrigue
  - naviguer - navigant - naviguant - to navigate
  - négliger - négligent - négligeant - to neglect
  - précéder - précédent - précédant - to precede
  - provoquer - provocant - provoquant - to provoke
  - suffoquer - suffocant - suffoquant - to suffocate
  - vaincre - vaincant - vainquant - to conquer
  - valoir - valent - valant - to be worth
  - violer - violent - violant - to assault
  - vaquer - vacant - vaquant - to take a break

=== Verbal adverb (Adverbe verbal) ===
Out of the present verbal adjectif, a present verbal adverb (adverbe verbal présent) can be formed for every verb by replacing nt with mment:

- courir - courant - couramment - to run
- précéder - précédent - précédemment - to precede

Out of the past verbal adjectif, a past verbal adverb (adverbe verbal passé) can be formed for some verbs by adding ment:

- assurer - assuré - assurément - to ascertain

== Defective verbs ==
Some verbs have incomplete conjugations: they do not have forms for certain tenses, moods, or persons. Such verbs are said to be defective. They include:

- some archaic verbs that survive only in very narrow contexts, such as accroire, choir, clore, ester, férir, gésir, occire, ouïr, poindre, and quérir. Hence, we have "Ci-gît un homme irremplaçable", "Oyez, oyez, braves gens !", and "Je l'ai obtenu sans coup férir."
- necessarily impersonal verbs, such as falloir, pleuvoir, s'agir, and importer. Hence, we have "Il fallait que tu viennes", "Il tonne", and "Il s'agit de réussir."
- some other verbs for which certain forms are useless, such as barrir, éclore, and pulluler. Hence, we have "Les moustiques pullulent", "Les fleurs éclosent", and "L'âne brait."

== See also ==
- French grammar
- French verbs
- French conjugation
