= QVE =

QVE or Q-VE may refer to:

- Quantificational variability effect — a linguistic observation about a feature of natural language semantics
- Quintessential Vocal Ensemble — an amateur choral group from Canada
- Quantum Vlasov equation — in physics
- Perodua QV-E — Malaysia's first homegrown fully electric vehicle
