= -ly =

English language suffix

The suffix -ly in English is usually a contraction of -like, similar to the Anglo-Saxon -lice and German -lich. It is often added to an adjective to form an adverb.

== Origin and cognates ==
Though the origin of the suffix is Germanic, it may now be added to adjectives of Latin origin, as in publicly. The suffix is related to the word like and may descend from an earlier form meaning 'shape' or 'form'. The adjective to which the suffix is added may have been lost from the language, as in the case of early, in which the Anglo-Saxon word aer only survives in the poetic usage ere.

== Grammatical rules and conventions ==
It is commonly added to an adjective to form an adverb, but in some cases it is used to form an adjective, such as ugly or manly. When "-ly" is used to form an adjective, it is attached to a noun instead of an adjective (i.e., friendly, lovely).

When the suffix is added to a word ending in the letter y, the y before the suffix is replaced with the letter i, as in happily (from happy). This does not always apply in the case of monosyllabic words; for example, shy becomes shyly (but dry can become dryly or drily, and gay becomes gaily). Other examples are heavily (from heavy), luckily (from lucky), temporarily (from temporary), easily (from easy), emptily (from empty), and funnily (from funny).

When the suffix is added to a word ending in double l, only y is added with no additional l; for example, full becomes fully. Note also wholly (from whole), which may be pronounced either with a single l sound (like holy) or with a doubled (geminate) l.

When the suffix is added to an adjective ending in a vowel letter followed by the letter l, it results in an adverb spelled with -lly, for example, the adverb centrally from the adjective central, but without a geminated l sound in pronunciation. Other examples are actually, historically, really, carefully, especially, and usually. When the suffix is added to a word ending in a consonant followed by le (pronounced as a syllabic l), generally the mute e is dropped, the l loses its syllabic nature, and no additional l is added; this category is mostly composed of adverbs that end in -ably or -ibly (and correspond to adjectives ending in -able or -ible), such as probably, presumably, visibly, terribly, horribly and possibly, but it also includes other words such as nobly, feebly, simply, doubly, triply, quadriply and idly. However, there are a few words where this contraction is not always applied, such as brittlely.

When -ly is added to an adjective ending -ic, the adjective is usually first expanded by the addition of -al. For example, there are adjectives historic and historical, but the only adverb is historically. Other examples are basically, alphabetically, scientifically, chemically, classically, and astronomically. There are a few exceptions such as publicly.

Adjectives in -ly can form inflected comparative and superlative forms (such as friendlier, friendliest, lovelier, loveliest), but most adverbs with this ending do not (a word such as sweetly uses the periphrastic forms more sweetly, most sweetly). For more details see Adverbs and Comparison in the English grammar article.

== Domain ==
The Libyan domain, .ly was used for domain hacks for this suffix.

== See also ==
- -ing – the suffix used to form gerunds and present tense
- -ed
- -logy
- -ism
