= Quantificational variability effect =

Concept in formal semantics

Quantificational variability effect (QVE) is the intuitive equivalence of certain sentences with quantificational adverbs (Q-adverbs) and sentences without these, but with quantificational determiner phrases (DP) in argument position instead.

- 1. (a) A cat is usually smart. (Q-adverb)
- 1. (b) Most cats are smart. (DP)
- 2. (a) A dog is always smart. (Q-adverb)
- 2. (b) All dogs are smart. (DP)

Analysis of QVE is widely cited as entering the literature with David Lewis' "Adverbs of Quantification" (1975), where he proposes QVE as a solution to Peter Geach's donkey sentence (1962). Terminology, and comprehensive analysis, is normally attributed to Stephen Berman's "Situation-Based Semantics for Adverbs of Quantification" (1987).

== See also ==
- David Kellogg Lewis
- Donkey pronoun
- Existential closure
- Irene Heim

== Literature ==
Core texts

- Berman, Stephen. The Semantics of Open Sentences. PhD thesis. University of Massachusetts Amherst, 1991.
- Berman, Stephen. 'An Analysis of Quantifier Variability in Indirect Questions'. In MIT Working Papers in Linguistics 11. Edited by Phil Branigan and others. Cambridge: MIT Press, 1989. Pages 1–16.
- Berman, Stephen. 'Situation-Based Semantics for Adverbs of Quantification'. In University of Massachusetts Occasional Papers 12. Edited by J. Blevins and Anne Vainikka. Graduate Linguistic Student Association (GLSA), University of Massachusetts Amherst, 1987. Pages 45–68.

Select bibliography
