= Possession (linguistics) =

Aspect of linguistics representing subordinate relationships between things

In linguistics, possession is an asymmetric relationship between two constituents, the referent of one of which (the possessor) in some sense possesses (owns, has as a part, rules over, etc.) the referent of the other (the possessed).

Possession may be marked in many ways, such as simple juxtaposition of nouns, possessive case, possessed case, construct state (as in Arabic and Nêlêmwa), or adpositions (possessive suffixes, possessive adjectives). For example, English uses a possessive clitic, 's; a preposition, of; and adjectives, my, your, his, her, etc.

Predicates denoting possession may be formed either by using a verb (such as the English have) or by other means, such as existential clauses (as is usual in languages such as Russian).

Some languages have more than two possessive classes. In Papua New Guinea, for example, the Anêm language has at least 20 and the Amele language has 32.

== Alienable and inalienable ==
There are many types of possession, but a common distinction is alienable and inalienable possession. Alienability refers to the ability to dissociate something from its 'parent'; in this case, a quality from that to which that quality applies.

When something is inalienably possessed, it is usually an attribute. For example, John's big nose is inalienably possessed because it cannot (without surgery) be removed from John; it is simply a quality that he has. In contrast, 'John's briefcase' is alienably possessed because it can be separated from John.

Many languages make the distinction as part of their grammar, typically by using different affixes for alienable and inalienable possession. For example, in Mikasuki (a Muskogean language of Florida), ač-akni (inalienable) means 'my body', but am-akni (alienable) means 'my meat'. English does not have any way of making such distinctions (the example from Mikasuki is clear to English-speakers only because there happen to be two different words in English that translate -akni in the two senses: both Mikasuki words could be translated as 'my flesh', and the distinction would then disappear in English).

Possessive pronouns in Polynesian languages such as Hawaiian and Māori are associated with nouns distinguishing between o-class, a-class and neutral pronouns, according to the relationship of possessor and possessed. The o-class possessive pronouns are used if the possessive relationship cannot be begun or ended by the possessor.

=== Obligatory possession ===
Obligatory possession is sometimes called inalienable possession. The latter, however, is a semantic notion that largely depends on how a culture structures the world, while obligatory possession is a property of morphemes. In general, nouns with the property of requiring obligatory possession are notionally inalienably possessed, but the fit is rarely, if ever, perfect.

== Inherent and non-inherent ==
Another distinction, similar to that between alienable and inalienable possession, is made between inherent and non-inherent possession. In languages that mark the distinction, inherently-possessed nouns, such as parts of wholes, cannot be mentioned without indicating their dependent status.

Yabem of Papua New Guinea, for instance, distinguishes alienable from inalienable possession when the possessor is human, but it distinguishes inherent from non-inherent possession when the possessor is not human. Inherently-possessed nouns are marked with the prefix ŋa-, as in (ka) ŋalaka '(tree) branch', (lôm) ŋatau '(men's house) owner' and (talec) ŋalatu '(hen's) chick'. Adjectives that are derived from nouns (as inherent attributes of other entities) are also so marked, as in ŋadani 'thick, dense' (from dani 'thicket') or ŋalemoŋ 'muddy, soft' (from lemoŋ 'mud').

== Possessable and unpossessable ==
Many languages, such as Maasai, distinguish between the possessable and the unpossessable. Possessable things include farm animals, tools, houses, family members and money, but wild animals, landscape features and weather phenomena are examples of what cannot be possessed. That means basically that in such languages, saying my sister is grammatically correct but not my land. Instead, one would have to use a circumlocution such as the land that I own.

== Greater and lesser possession (in quantity) ==
Greater and lesser possession (in quantity) is used in Modern Mansi.

== Locative possession ==
Locative possessive is used in some Uralic languages.

== Clauses denoting possession ==
=== Possession verbs ===
Many languages have verbs that can be used to form clauses denoting possession. For example, English uses the verb have for that purpose, French uses avoir etc. There are often alternative ways of expressing such relationships (for example, the verbs possess and belong and others can be used in English in appropriate contexts: see also have got).

In some languages, different possession verbs are used, depending on whether the object is animate or inanimate, as can be seen in two examples from Georgian:

Kompiuteri makvs ("I have a computer")
Dzaghli mqavs ("I have a dog")

Since a dog is animate and a computer is not, different verbs are used. However some nouns in Georgian, such as car, are treated as animate even though they appear to refer to an inanimate object.

=== Possession indicated by existential clauses ===
In some languages, possession relationships are indicated by existential clauses. For example, in Russian, "I have a friend" can be expressed by the sentence у меня есть друг u menya yest drug, which literally means "at me there is a friend". The same is true of Hebrew, e.g. "I have a dog", יש לי כלב, yesh li kelev, which literally means "there is for me a dog".

Latvian, Irish, Turkish and Uralic languages (such as Hungarian and Finnish) use an existential clause to assess a possession since the verb to have does not have that function in those languages. Japanese has the verb motsu meaning "to have" or "to hold", but in most circumstances, the existential verbs iru and aru are used instead (with the possessed as the verb's subject and the possessor as the sentence's topic: uchi wa imōto ga iru, "I have a younger sister", or more literally "as for my house, there is a younger sister").

For more examples, see Existential clause § Indication of possession.

== See also ==
- Genitive case
- Possessive adjective
- Possessive case
- Possessive pronoun
- Possessive suffix

== Sources ==
- Heine, Bernd (1997) Possession: Cognitive sources, forces, and grammaticalization. Cambridge: Cambridge University Press. ISBN 978-0-521-02413-6
