= One (pronoun) =

English language, gender-neutral, indefinite pronoun

One is an English language, gender-neutral, indefinite pronoun that means, roughly, "a person". For purposes of verb agreement it is a third-person singular pronoun, though it sometimes appears with first- or second-person reference. It is sometimes called an impersonal pronoun. It is more or less equivalent to the Scots "a body", the French pronoun on, the German/Scandinavian man, and the Spanish uno. It can take the possessive form one's and the reflexive form oneself, or it can adopt those forms from the generic he with his and himself.

The pronoun one often has connotations of formality, and is often avoided in favour of more colloquial alternatives such as generic you. The noun one can also be used as a pro-form (e.g. "The green one is an apple"), which is not to be confused with the pronoun.

== Morphology ==
In Standard Modern English, the pronoun one has three shapes representing five distinct word forms:

- one: the nominative (subjective) and accusative (objective, also known as oblique case) forms
- one's: the dependent and independent genitive (possessive) forms
  - Unlike the possessive forms of the personal pronouns and who (its, hers, whose, etc.), one's is written with the apostrophe.
- oneself: the reflexive form

== History ==
The word one developed from Old English an, itself from Proto-Germanic *ainaz, from Proto-Indo-European root *oi-no-, but it was not originally a pronoun. The pronoun one may have come into use as an imitation of French on beginning in the 15th century. One's self appears in the mid-1500s, and is written as one word from about 1827.

== Pronoun vs pro-form ==
There is a pronoun one, but there is also a noun and a determiner that are often called pronouns because they function as pro-forms. Pronoun is a category of words (a "part of speech"). A pro-form is a function of a word or phrase that stands in for (expresses the same content as) another, where the meaning is recoverable from the context. In English, pronouns mostly function as pro-forms, but there are pronouns that are not pro-forms and pro-forms that are not pronouns.

Pronouns vs Pro-forms
	Example	Pronoun	Pro-form	"Stands for"
1	It depends on one's attitude.	✓	✓	"a / the person's"
2	I know the people who work there.	✓	✓	"the people"
3	Who works there?	✓		
4	It's raining.	✓		
5	I asked her to help, and she did so right away.		✓	"helped"
6	JJ and Petra helped, but the others didn't.		✓	e.g., "Sho, Alana, and Ali"
7	Those apples look good. Can I have two small ones?		✓	"(two small) apples"
8	One plus one is two.			

Examples [1 & 2] show pronouns and pro-forms. In [1], the pronoun one "stands in" for "a / the person". In [2], the relative pronoun who stands in for "the people".

Examples [3 & 4] show pronouns but not pro-forms. In [3], the interrogative pronoun who does not stand in for anything. Similarly, in [4], it is a dummy pronoun, one that does not stand in for anything. No other word can function there with the same meaning; we do not say "the sky is raining" or "the weather is raining".

Examples [5–7] show pro-forms that are not pronouns. In [5], did so is a verb phrase, but it stands in for "helped". Similarly, in [6], others is a common noun, not a pronoun, but the others stands in for this list of names of the other people involved (e.g., Sho, Alana, and Ali). And in [7], one is a common noun. This should be clear because, unlike pronouns, it readily takes a determiner (two) and an adjective phrase modifier (small), and because its plural form is the usual -s of common nouns.

Example [8] is a common noun. It's neither a pronoun nor a pro-form.

== Syntax ==
=== Functions ===
One can appear as a subject, object, determiner or predicative complement. The reflexive form also appears as an adjunct.

- Subject: One cannot help but grow older. One must pay for oneself to go.
- Object: Drunkenness can make one unreliable. A reputation travels with one. One must help oneself.
- Predicative complement: One need only be oneself.
- Dependent determiner: Being with one's friends is a joy.
- Independent determiner: (no known examples)
  - Such sentences as one's is broken; I sat on one's; I broke one's; etc. are not found.
- Adjunct: One must do it oneself.
- Modifier: (no known examples)

=== Dependents ===
Pronouns rarely take dependents, and one is particularly resistant in this respect, though it may have some of the same kind of dependents as other noun phrases.

- Relative clause modifier: one who knows oneself
- Determiner: (no known examples)
  - An example like the following has the common noun one: Man has constructed woman as' the Other', as the one who is not oneself. The pronoun has no plural form, but the common noun example could be ...as the ones who are not oneself.
- Adjective phrase modifier: (no known examples)
- Adverb phrase external modifier: not even oneself

== Semantics ==
One generally denotes any single unidentified person, or "any person at all, including (esp. in later use) the speaker himself or herself; ‘you, or I, or anyone’; a person in general." It is usually definite but non-specific.

=== Royal one ===
Monarchs, some of the upper class, and particularly Queen Elizabeth II during her reign, are often depicted as using one as a first-person pronoun. This was frequently used as a caricature by the press when they referred to the Queen or other senior members of the Royal Family. For example, the headline "One is not amused" is attributed humorously to her, implicitly referencing Queen Victoria's supposed statement "We are not amused," containing instead the royal we. Another example near the end of 1992, a difficult year for the royal family dubbed by the Queen as an "Annus horribilis", the tabloid newspaper The Sun published the headline, "One's Bum Year!"

== Alternatives ==
=== For repeated one ===
In formal English, once a sentence uses the indefinite pronoun one, it must continue to use the same pronoun (or its supplementary forms one's, oneself). It is considered incorrect to replace it with another pronoun such as he or she. For example:

- One can glean from this whatever one may.
- If one were to look at oneself, one's impression would be...

However, some speakers find this usage overly formal and stilted, and do replace repeated occurrences of one with a personal pronoun, most commonly the generic he:

- One can glean from this whatever he may.
- If one were to look at himself, his impression would be...

Another reason for inserting a third-person pronoun in this way may sometimes be to underline that one is not intended to be understood as referring particularly to the listener or to the speaker. A problem with the generic he, however, is that it may not be viewed as gender-neutral; this may sometimes be avoided by using singular they instead, though some purists view this as ungrammatical (particularly when the question arises of whether its reflexive form should be themselves or themself).

Examples are also found, particularly in the spoken language, where a speaker switches mid-sentence from the use of one to the generic you (its informal equivalent, as described in the following section). This type of inconsistency is strongly criticized by language purists.

=== For one in general ===
A common and less formal alternative to the indefinite pronoun one is generic you, used to mean not the listener specifically, but people in general.

- One needs to provide food for oneself and one's family. (formal)
- You need to provide food for yourself and your family. (informal if used with the meaning of the above sentence)

When excluding oneself, one can use the generic they:

- In Japan they work extremely hard, often sacrificing comfort for themselves and their families.

Other techniques that can be used to avoid the use of one, in contexts where it seems over-formal, include use of the passive voice, pluralizing the sentence (so as to talk about "people", for example), use of other indefinite pronouns such as someone or phrases like "a person" or "a man", and other forms of circumlocution.

Occasionally, the pronoun one as considered here may be avoided so as to avoid ambiguity with other uses of the word one. For example, in the sentence If one enters two names, one will be rejected, the second one may refer either to the person entering the names, or to one of the names.

== See also ==
- Generic antecedent – Representatives of classes in a situation in which gender is typically unknown
- Nosism – Practice of using "we" to refer to oneself
- Gender-specific and gender-neutral third-person pronouns
- Generic you
- Generic they
