= Defective verb =

Verb with incomplete conjugation

In linguistics, a defective verb is a verb that either lacks a conjugated form or entails incomplete conjugation, and thus cannot be conjugated for certain grammatical tenses, aspects, persons, genders, or moods that the majority of verbs or a "normal" or regular verb in a particular language can be conjugated for. That is to say, a defective verb lacks forms that most verbs in a particular language have.

== English ==
=== Common defectives ===
The most commonly recognized defective verbs in English are auxiliary verbs—the class of preterite-present verbs—can/could, may/might, shall/should, must, ought, and will/would (would being a later historical development). Though these verbs were not originally defective, in most varieties of English today, they occur only in a modal auxiliary sense. However, unlike normal auxiliary verbs, they are not regularly conjugated in the infinitive mood. Therefore, these defective auxiliaries do not accept each other as objects. Additionally, they do not regularly appear as participles.

For example, can lacks an infinitive, future tense, participle, imperative, and gerund. The missing parts of speech are instead supplied by using the appropriate forms of to be plus able to. So, while I could write and I was able to write have the same meaning, I could has two meanings depending on use, which are I was able to or I would be able to. One cannot say *I will can, which is instead expressed as I will be able to. Similarly, must has no true past tense form, this instead being supplied by had (the past tense of have), and "to have to" in the infinitive, an example of composite conjugation. The past tense expressing the obligatory aspect of must is expressed as "had to", as in He had to go. "Must have", on the other hand, expresses probability or likelihood in modern English; for example, "If that's thunder, there must have been lightning."

Some verbs are becoming more defective as time goes on; for example, although might is etymologically the past tense (preterite) of may, it is no longer generally used as such (for example, *he might not go (Note: This article uses asterisks to indicate ungrammatical examples.) to mean "he was forbidden to go"). Similarly, should is no longer used as the past of shall, but with a separate meaning indicating possibility or moral obligation. (However, the use of the preterite form should as a subjunctive form continues, as in If I should go there tomorrow, ..., which contrasts with the indicative form I shall go there tomorrow.) The defective verb ought was etymologically the past tense of owe (the affection he ought his children), but it has since split off, leaving owe as a non-defective verb with its original sense and a regular past tense (owed).

Beyond the modal auxiliaries, beware is a fully defective verb in current Modern English: its only, unmarked form is regularly used (in simple aspect, active voice) in the infinitive (I must beware of the dog), imperative (Beware of the dog, [Let the] buyer beware) and subjunctive (She insists that he beware of the dog), but too much of the finite indicative mood is formally lacking (all simple past *bewared, one simple present *bewares, all aspects *am bewaring, etc.). The word begone is similar: any usage other than as an imperative is highly marked. Another defective verb is the archaic quoth, a past tense which is the only surviving form of the verb quethe, "to say" (related to bequeath).

The compound auxiliary verb used to, which is derived from the regular verb to use, also has only a simple past tense. It lacks an infinitive, simple present, or participle. The only alternative form, in standard usage, is use to which occurs when the verb has do-support.

=== Impersonal verbs ===
Impersonal verbs such as to rain and to snow share some characteristics with the defective verbs in that forms such as I rain or they snow are not often found; however, the crucial distinction is that impersonal verbs are "missing" certain forms for semantic reasons—in other words, the forms themselves exist and the verb is capable of being fully conjugated with all its forms (and is therefore not defective) but some forms are unlikely to be found because they appear meaningless or nonsensical.

Nevertheless, native speakers can typically use and understand metaphorical or even literal sentences where the "meaningless" forms exist, such as I rained on his parade or She doesn't frost cakes, she snows them.

Contrast the impersonal verb rain (all the forms of which exist, even if they sometimes look semantically odd) with the defective verb can (only I can and I could are possible). In most cases, a synonym for the defective verb must be used instead (for example, "to be able to"). (The forms with an asterisk ⟨*⟩ are impossible, at least with respect to the relevant sense of the verb; these phonemes may by coincidence be attested with respect to a homograph [as with "canning" = "the act of preserving and packaging in cans"].)

I rain	I can	I am able to
I rained	I could	I was able to
I am raining	*I am canning	*I am being able to
I have rained	*I have could	I have been able to
to rain	*to can	to be able to

== Arabic ==
In Arabic, defective verbs are called أفعال جامدة ʾafʿāl jāmidah (lit., 'solid verbs'). These verbs do not change tense, nor do they form related nouns. A famous example is the verb لَيْسَ laysa 'it is not', though it is not the only auxiliary verb that exhibits this property. Some Arabic grammarians argue that دَامَ dāma (as an auxiliary verb) is also completely defective; those who dispute this claim still consider it partially defective. Some other partially defective verbs are فَتِئَ fatiʔa and زَالَ zāla, which have neither an imperative form nor an infinitive form when used as auxiliary verbs.

== Catalan ==
In Catalan, defective verbs are usually defective for semantic reasons. Due to their impersonal nature, haver-hi and caldre are used in only the third person. The implicit repetition intrinsic to the meaning of soler results in it having forms in only the present and imperfect tenses. Verbs pertaining to meteorological phenomena, such as ploure, can be conjugated in only the third person singular, although a third person plural form is also possible when used with a metaphorical sense. Additionally, lleure is used only in the third person, while dar lacks present tense forms, with the exceptions of the first person plural and second person plural. Defective verbs in Catalan can generally also be used in the impersonal forms of the infinitive, gerund, and past participle.

== Finnish ==
At least one Finnish verb lacks the first infinitive (dictionary/lemma) form. In Finnish, "kutian helposti" ("I'm sensitive to tickling") can be said, but for the verb "kutian" (here conjugated in singular first person, present tense) there is no non-conjugated form. Hypothetically, the first infinitive could be "kudita", but this form is not actually used. Additionally, the negative verb (ei, et, en, emme...) does not have an infinitive form.

== French ==
There are several defective verbs in French.

- falloir ("to be necessary"; only the third-person forms with il exist; the present indicative conjugation, il faut, is very commonly used, impersonal verb)
- braire ("to bray"; only infinitive, present participle, and third-person forms exist)
- frire ("to fry"; lacks non-compound past forms; speakers paraphrase with equivalent forms of faire frire)
- clore ("to conclude"; lacks imperfect and past simple conjugations)
- gésir ("to lie horizontally", often used in inscriptions on gravestones; can be conjugated in only the present, imperfect, present imperative, present participle and extremely rarely, the simple future forms)

Impersonal verbs, such as weather verbs, function as they do in English.

== German ==
In contemporary German, the verb erkiesen, which means "to choose/elect" (usually referring to a person chosen for a special task or honour), is used in only the past participle (erkoren) and, more rarely, the past tense (ich erkor etc.). All other forms, including the infinitive, have long become obsolete and are now unknown and unintelligible to modern speakers. It remains commonplace in the closely related Dutch language as verkiezen; for example, Verkiezingen in Nederland (Elections in the Netherlands).

== Classical Greek ==
"No single Greek verb shows all the tenses", and "most verbs have only six of" the nine classes of tense-systems, and "[s]carcely any verb shows all nine systems".

The verb χρή (khrē, 'it is necessary') exists in only the third-person-singular present and imperfect ἐχρῆν / χρῆν (ekhrēn / khrēn, 'it was necessary').

There are also verbs such as οἶδα (oida, 'I know'), which use the perfect form for the present and the pluperfect (here ᾔδη ēidē, 'I was knowing') for the imperfect.

Additionally, the verb εἰμί (eimi, 'I am') has only a present, a future and an imperfect – it lacks an aorist, a perfect, a pluperfect and a future perfect.

== Hindustani ==
In Hindustani (Hindi and Urdu) all the verbs except the verb hona (to be) lack the following conjugations.

1. Indicative Mood
  - Present
  - Imperfect
2. Presumptive Mood
3. Subjunctive Mood
  - Present

The comparison between the conjugations of hona (to be) and the conjugations of all other verbs are shown in the table below:

non-aspectual conjugations of "honā (to be)"
mood	tense	singular						plural	
mood	tense	1P - mãĩ		2P - tum^{1}		3P - yah/ye, vah/vo		1P - ham^{1}	
mood	tense	1P - mãĩ		2P - tum^{1}		3P - yah/ye, vah/vo		2P - āp^{1}	
mood	tense	1P - mãĩ		2P - tum^{1}		2P - tū		3P - ye, ve/vo	
mood	tense	♂	♀	♂	♀	♂	♀	♂	♀
indicative	present	hū̃		ho		hai		hãĩ	
indicative	perfect	huā	huī	hue	huī	huā	huī	hue	huī̃
indicative	imperfect	thā	thī	the	thī	thā	thī	the	thī̃
indicative	future^{2} - 1	hoū̃gā	hoū̃gī	hooge	hoogī	hoegā	hoegī	hoẽge	hoẽgī
indicative	future^{2} - 2	hū̃gā	hū̃gī	hoge	hogī	hogā	hogī	hõge	hõgī
presumptive	present	hū̃gā	hū̃gī	hoge	hogī	hogā	hogī	hõge	hõgī
presumptive	past	hū̃gā	hū̃gī	hoge	hogī	hogā	hogī	hõge	hõgī
subjunctive	present	hū̃		ho		ho		hõ	
subjunctive	future	hoū̃		hoo		hoe		hoẽ	
contrafactual	past	hotā	hotī	hote	hotī	hotā	hotī	hote	hotī̃
imperative	present	—		hoo		ho		hoiye	
imperative	future	—		honā		hoiyo		hoiyegā	

non-aspectual conjugations of "karnā (to do)"
mood	tense	singular						plural	
mood	tense	1P - mãĩ		2P - tum^{1}		3P - yah/ye, vah/vo		1P - ham^{1}	
mood	tense	1P - mãĩ		2P - tum^{1}		3P - yah/ye, vah/vo		2P - āp^{1}	
mood	tense	1P - mãĩ		2P - tum^{1}		2P - tū		3P - ye, ve/vo	
mood	tense	♂	♀	♂	♀	♂	♀	♂	♀
indicative	present	—		—		—		—	
indicative	perfect	kiyā	kī	kiye	kī	kiyā	kī	kiye	kī̃
indicative	imperfect	—	—	—	—	—	—	—	—
indicative	future^{2} - 1	karū̃gā	karū̃gī	karoge	karogī	karegā	karegī	karẽge	karẽgī
indicative	future^{2} - 2	—	—	—	—	—	—	—	—
presumptive	present	—	—	—	—	—	—	—	—
presumptive	past	—	—	—	—	—	—	—	—
subjunctive	present	—	—	—	—	—	—	—	—
subjunctive	future	karū̃		karo		kare		karẽ	
contrafactual	past	kartā	kartī	karte	kartī	kartā	kartī	karte	kartī̃
imperative	present	—		karo		kar		kariye	
imperative	future	—		karnā		kariyo		kariyegā	

^{1} the pronouns tum, āp, and ham can be used in both singular and plural sense, akin to the English pronoun you, although the singular use of ham is proscribed.
^{2} the indicative future 1 and future 2 conjugations are synonymous; however, only the future 2 conjugations can be used as the presumptive mood copula.

Some verbs in Hindustani which have monosyllabic verb roots ending in the vowels /i/, /ī/ or /e/ are defective because they have the second person intimate and formal future imperative conjugations which are uncommon to native speakers of Hindustani and are almost rarely used. The * mark before some intimate imperative forms below shows those rarely used forms.

Verbs	Infinitive	Intimate		Neutral		Formal	
Verbs	Infinitive	Present	Future	Present	Future	Present	Future
do	karnā	kar	kariyo	karo	karnā	kījiye	kījiyegā
give	denā	de	diyo	do	denā	dījiye	dījiyegā
drink	pīnā	pī	*pīiyo	piyo	pīnā	pījiye	pījiyegā
live	jīnā	jī	*jīiyo	jiyo	jīnā	*jīiye	*jīiyegā
sew	sīnā	sī	*sīiyo	siyo	sīnā	*sīiye	*sīiyegā

== Hungarian ==
Some Hungarian verbs have either no subjunctive forms or forms which sound uncommon to native speakers; for example, csuklik 'hiccup'. See also a short summary about them in the English-language Wiktionary.

== Icelandic ==
The Icelandic verb ske 'happen', a borrowing from Danish, has only a third person inflection and is one of a few Icelandic verbs not to end in -a (like verbs in -á and þvo). The verbs munu 'will' and skulu 'shall' also end in a vowel other than -a and lack all past indicative forms.

== Irish ==
Arsa 'says' can be used only in the past or present tense. The copula is lacks a future tense, an imperative mood, and a verbal noun. It has no distinct conditional tense forms either, but conditional expressions are possible, expressed using past tense forms; for example Ba mhaith liom é, which can mean both 'I liked it' and 'I would like it'. The imperative mood is sometimes suppletively created by using the imperative forms of the substantive verb bí. Future tense forms, however, are impossible and can be expressed only periphrastically.

There is also dar '[it] appears, seems', a temporally independent verb that always appears in combination with the preposition le.

{Dar liom} go bhfuil ceart agat.
{It seems to me} that be.PRES.DEP.INDIR.REL correct at.2SG
"It seems to me that you are right."

== Korean ==
Korean has several defective verbs. (말다 malda 'to stop or desist') may be used in only the imperative form or in the hortative form, after an 'action verb + 지 (ji)' construction. Within this scope it can still conjugate for different levels of politeness, such as 하지 마! Haji ma! 'Stop that!', in contrast with 하지 마십시오 Haji masipsiyo 'Please, don't do that'. Also, 데리다 derida 'to bring/pick up someone' is used only as 데리고 derigo 'bringing X and...', 데리러derireo 'in order to pick up', or 데려 deryeo 'to pick up' in some compound forms.

== Latin ==
Latin has defective verbs that possess forms only in the perfect tense; such verbs have no present tense forms whatsoever. These verbs are still present in meaning. For example, the first-person form odi ("I hate") and infinitive odisse ("to hate") appear to be the perfect of a hypothetical verb *odo/odio, but in fact have a present-tense meaning. Similarly, the verb memini, meminisse is conjugated in the perfect, yet has a present meaning:

meminī
meministī
meminit
meminimus
meministis
meminērunt

Instead of the past-tense "I remembered", "you remembered", etc., these forms signify the present-tense "I remember", "you remember", etc. Latin defective verbs also possess regularly formed pluperfect forms with simple past tense meanings and future perfect forms with simple future tense meanings. Compare deponent verbs, which are passive in form but active in meaning.

The verb coepī, coepisse, which means "to have begun" or "began", is another verb that lacks a present tense system. However, it is not present in meaning. The verb incipiō, incipere ("I begin," "to begin") is used in the present tense instead. This is not a case of suppletion, however, because the verb incipere can also be used in the perfect.

The verbs inquit and ait, both meaning "said", cannot be conjugated through all forms. Both verbs lack numerous inflected forms, with entire tenses and voices missing altogether.

== Malayic ==
Many Malayic languages, including Malay and Indonesian, have many defective verbs. Defective verbs in the related Besemah language (South Barisan Malay), for example, have been explained by McDonnell (2016). He is not directly using the term "defective verb", but instead "verb root productivity".

Verb inflection in Besemah
	Bound root	Verbal root		Nominal root
	Bound root	Transitive	Intransitive	Nominal root
Root	*capak	idup	tanam	gunting
Root	"to discard"	"to live"	"to plant"	"scissors"
Free	—	idup	tanam	gunting
Free	—	"live, on"	"plant (pv)"	"scissors"
-an	capakan	—	tanaman	guntingan
-an	"discarded"	—	"plant"	"cut"
be-	becapak	—	betanam	begunting
be-	"take off"	—	"plant rice"	"use/have scissors"
te-	tecapak	teidup	tetanam	tegunting
te-	"inadvertently discarded"	"inadvertently take on"	"be planted"	"inadvertently cut"
N-	ncapak	—	ntanam	nggunting
N-	"throw up"	—	"plant"	"cut"
pv	—	—	(di)tanam	digunting
pv	—	—	"plant"	"cut"
-ka	capakka	idupka	tanamka	guntingka
-ka	"throw away"	"turn on"	"plant"	"cut on"
-i	capaki	idupi	tanami	guntingi
-i	"take off"	"watch over"	"plant in"	"cut (repeatedly)"

== Polish ==
Widać 'it is evident' and słychać 'it is audible' are both highly defective in Polish. The only forms of these verbs that exist are the infinitives. They both work as impersonal verbs in a visible or audible situation that does not require another verb (although may have one), and they have no distinction between singular and plural. For example Widać blask wśród drzew 'A glow is visible among the trees' or Jego głos słychać w całym domu 'His voice can be heard in the whole house'.

== Portuguese ==
A large number of Portuguese verbs are defective in person; that is, they lack the proper form for one of the pronouns in some tense. The verb colorir ("to color") has no first-person singular in the present, thus requiring a paraphrase, such as estou colorindo ("I am coloring") or the use of another verb of a similar meaning, such as pintar ("to paint").

== Russian ==
Some Russian verbs are defective, in that they lack a first person singular non-past form: for example, победить 'to win', убедить 'to convince', дудеть 'to play the pipe'. These are all verbs whose stem ends in a palatalized alveolar consonant; they are not a closed class, but include in their number neologisms and loanwords such as френдить (to friend, as on a social network). Where such a verb form would be required, speakers typically substitute a synonymous verb (Я выиграю), or use a periphrastic construction involving nominalization and an additional verb (Я одержу победу). Also the word могу 'I'll be able to, I'll manage to' is used: (Я) смогу победить, (я) смогу убедить.

Many experiential verbs describe processes that humans cannot generally undergo, such as пригореть 'to be burnt, regarding food', куститься 'to grow in clusters', and протекать 'to seep'—are ordinarily nonsensical in the first or second person. As these forms rarely appear, they are often described as "defective" in descriptions of Russian grammar. However, this is a semantic constraint rather than a syntactic one; compare the classic nonsensical-but-grammatical sentence Colorless green ideas sleep furiously, or more directly, the English phrase I am raining. First and second person forms of these verbs do see use in metaphor and poetry.

== Spanish ==
Spanish defective verbs generally use forms with stem endings that begin with -i. The verbs are not commonly used.

- aguerrir
- arrecirse
- aterirse
- balbucir (found in forms ending in -i, but mostly replaced by balbucear)
- blandir
- despavorir
- empedernir
- garantir (usually replaced by garantizar, which is regular)
- soler (always used as helping verb, so many forms, although possible, won't make sense)
- usucapir (to acquire property rights through customary use; only in the infinitive in legal texts)

The following two verbs used to be defective verbs but are now normally conjugated.

- abolir (the Nueva gramática de la lengua española from the Real Academia (section 4.14d) now conjugates it normally, using abolo / aboles, etc.)
- agredir

== Swedish ==
The auxiliary verb måste 'must' lacks an infinitive, except in Swedish dialects spoken in Finland. Also, the verb is unique in that the form måste serves as both a present 'must' and past 'had to' form. The supine måst is rare.

== Telugu ==
The verb కావాలి kāvāli "want/to be wanted" does not inflect for tense, person, or aspect.

== Turkish ==
While the Turkish copula is not considered a verb in modern Turkish, it originated as the defective verb *imek — which is now written and pronounced as a suffix of the predicate. *İmek and the suffixes derived from it exist in only a few tenses; it is replaced by negative değil in the tenses originally supplied by *imek, and remaining forms by olmak 'to become' otherwise.

The verb can be conjugated only in certain tenses: past idi, inferential perfective imiş, conditional ise, and (non-finite) personal past participle idük (usable with possessive suffixes, notice the form was irregular).

== Ukrainian ==
Ukrainian Verbs ending in -вісти (for example, розповісти 'to tell PFV' and відповісти 'to answer PFV') lack imperative mood forms; imperfective verbs are used instead (for example, відповідай).

== Welsh ==
Welsh has several defective verbs, a number of which are archaic or literary. Some of the more common ones in everyday use include dylwn ("I should/ought"), found only in the imperfect and pluperfect tenses, meddaf ("I say"), found only in the present and imperfect, and geni ("to be born"), which has only a verb-noun and impersonal forms; for example, Ganwyd hi (She was born, literally "one bore her"). Common defective verbs in the spoken language are eisiau (pronounced, and often spelt, as isio or isie) and angen which mean 'to want' and 'to need' respectively; both are in fact nouns but are used in speech as if they were verb-nouns though they do not take the preceding yn, compare dw i'n canu 'I sing' vs. dw i eisiau 'I want'. The literary language would use these as nouns and not as defective verbs; for example, mae eisiau arnaf 'I want', literally 'there is a want on me'.

== See also ==
- Unpaired word – another form of lexical gap
