= Existential clause =

"there is"/"there are"; a claim that something exists

An existential clause is a clause that refers to the existence or presence of something, such as "There is a God" and "There are boys in the yard". The use of such clauses can be considered analogous to existential quantification in predicate logic, which is often expressed with the phrase "There exist(s)...".

Different languages have different ways of forming and using existential clauses. For details on the English forms, see English grammar: There as pronoun.

== Formation ==
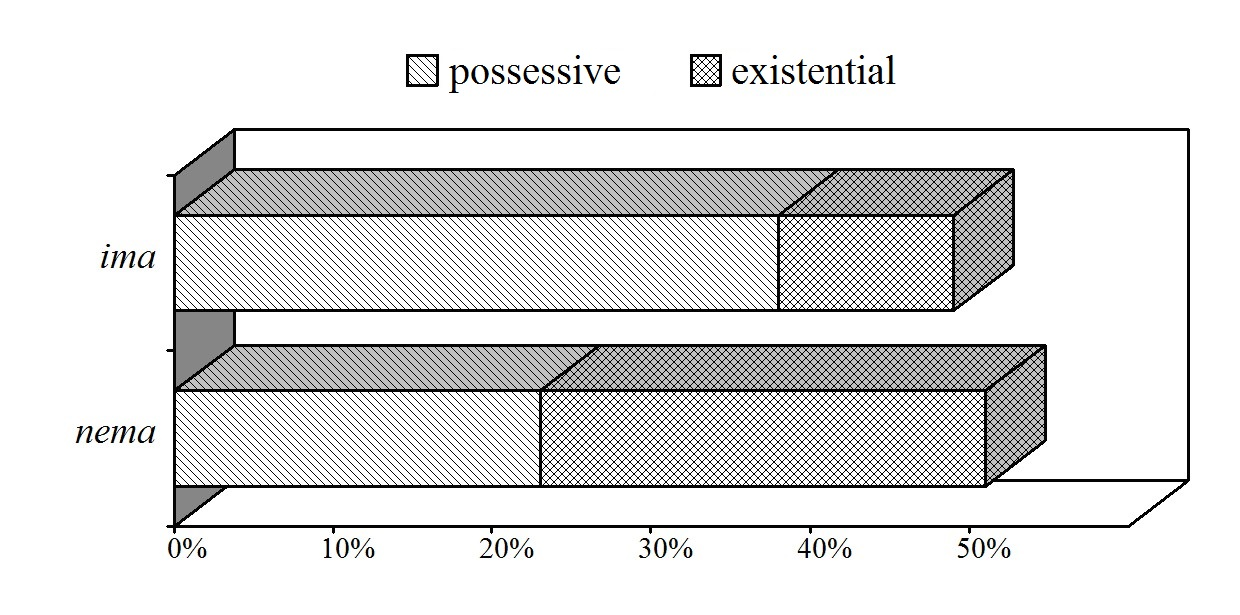
Frequency of habere in Serbo-Croatian

Many languages form existential clauses without any particular marker by simply using forms of the normal copula verb (the equivalent of English be), the subject being the noun (phrase) referring to the thing whose existence is asserted. For example, the Finnish sentence Pihalla on poikia, meaning "There are boys in the yard", is literally "On the yard is boys". Some languages have a different verb for that purpose: Swedish finnas has Det finns pojkar på gården, literally "It is found boys on the yard". On the other hand, some languages do not require a copula at all, and sentences analogous to "In the yard boys" are used. Some languages use the verb have; for example Serbo-Croatian U dvorištu ima dječaka is literally "In the yard has boys".

Some languages form the negative of existential clauses irregularly; for example, in Russian, есть yest ("there is/are") is used in affirmative existential clauses (in the present tense), but the negative equivalent is нет nyet ("there is/are not"), used with the logical subject in the genitive case.

In English, existential clauses usually use the dummy subject construction (also known as expletive) with there (infinitive: there be), as in "There are boys in the yard", but there is sometimes omitted when the sentence begins with another adverbial (usually designating a place), as in "In my room (there) is a large box." Other languages with constructions similar to the English dummy subject include French (see il y a) and German, which uses es ist, es sind or es gibt, literally "it is", "it are", "it gives".

== Uses ==
=== Indicating existence or presence ===
The principal meaning of existential clauses is to refer to the existence of something or the presence of something in a particular place or time. For example, "There is a God" asserts the existence of a God, but "There is a pen on the desk" asserts the presence or existence of a pen in a particular place.

Existential clauses can be modified like other clauses in terms of tense, negation, interrogative inversion, modality, finiteness, etc. For example, one can say "There was a God", "There is not a God" ("There is no God"), "Is there a God?", "There might be a God", "He was anxious for there to be a God" etc.

=== Pingelapese ===
An existential sentence is one of four structures associated within the Pingelapese language of Micronesia. The form heavily uses a post-verbal subject order and explains what exists or does not exist. Only a few Pingelapese verbs are used existential sentence structure: minae- "to exist", soh- "not to exist", dir- "to exist in large numbers", and daeri- "to be finished". All four verbs have a post-verbal subject in common and usually introduce new characters to a story. If a character is already known, the verb would be used in the preverbal position.

=== Indication of possession ===
In some languages, linguistic possession (in a broad sense) is indicated by existential clauses, rather than by a verb like have. For example, in Russian, "I have a friend" can be expressed by the sentence у меня есть друг u menya yest' drug, literally "at me there is a friend". Russian has a verb иметь imet' meaning "have", but it is less commonly used than the former method.

Other examples include Irish Tá peann agam "(There) is (a) pen at me" (for "I have a pen”). Hungarian Van egy halam "(There) is a fish-my" (for "I have a fish") and Turkish İki defterim var "two notebook-my (there) is" (for "I have two notebooks").

In Maltese, a change over time has been noted: "in the possessive construction, subject properties have been transferred diachronically from the possessed noun phrase to the possessor, while the possessor has all the subject properties except the form of the verb agreement that it triggers."

== Sources ==
- Everaert, M., H. van Riemsdijk and R. Goedemans (eds.) 2006. The Blackwell Companion to Syntax. London: Blackwell, London. [See "Existential sentences and expletive there" in Volume II.]
- Graffi, G. 2001. 200 Years of Syntax: A critical survey. Amsterdam: John Benjamins.
- Milsark, G. L. 1979. Existential Sentences in English. New York & London: Garland. [Published version of 1974 MIT Ph. D. dissertation]
- Moro, A. 1997. The Raising of Predicates: Predicative noun phrases and the theory of clause structure. Cambridge: Cambridge University Press.
