= Dummy pronoun =

Pronoun having no referent

A dummy pronoun, also known as an expletive pronoun, is a pronoun that does not refer to anything, and exists only to satisfy a syntactic requirement. For example, in the sentence "It rained" the English pronoun it is generally analyzed as a dummy pronoun, inserted to fill the subject position, but not referring to anything.

== Definition ==
The term dummy pronoun refers to the function of a word in a particular sentence, not a property of individual words. For example, it in the idiomatic expression "we made it on time" (as in, "we arrived successfully") would be considered a dummy pronoun, as the word it does not refer to any specific object. However, it in the sentence "that's our table, we made it" would be considered a referential pronoun (referring to the table).

Unlike a regular pronoun, dummy pronouns cannot be replaced by any noun phrase.

== Prevalence ==
Dummy pronouns are used in many languages across language families, with these languages generally clustering in northern Europe and West Africa. European language families that use dummy pronouns include Germanic languages, such as German and English, and Celtic languages, such as Welsh and Irish, whereas African language families that use them include Volta-Niger languages, such as Ewe and Esan, and Bantu languages, such as Xhosa and Tsonga.

Other common languages with dummy pronouns include French, and colloquially, in modern Hebrew and Thai.

Most of the world's languages are pronoun-dropping languages, meaning that they do not require dummy pronouns. These languages may instead use specific impersonal verbs, as Spanish does for weather. They may also be null-subject languages which would not require a word at all, such as Vietnamese.

== Dummy subjects ==
=== Weather it ===
One of the most common uses of dummy pronouns is with weather verbs, such as in the phrases "it is snowing" or "it is hot." In these sentences, the verb (to snow, to rain, etc.) is usually considered semantically impersonal even though it appears syntactically intransitive; in this view, the required it in "it is snowing" is a dummy word that does not refer. In English literature, there is also marginal use of the feminine she, such as in the phrase "She's going to rain."

==== Other views ====
Although the weather it is frequently considered a dummy pronoun, there have been a few objections to this interpretation. Noam Chomsky has argued that the it employed as the subject of English weather verbs can control the subject of an adjunct clause, just like a "normal" subject. For example, compare:

She brushes her teeth before having a bath.

→ She brushes her teeth before she has a bath.

It sometimes rains after snowing.

→ It sometimes rains after it snows.

If this analysis is accepted, then the "weather it" is to be considered a "quasi-(verb) argument" and not a dummy word.

Some linguists such as D. L. Bolinger go further, claiming that the "weather it" simply refers to a general state of affairs in the context of the utterance. In this case, it would not be a dummy word at all. Possible evidence for this claim includes exchanges such as:

Was it nice (out) yesterday?
No, it rained.

where it is implied to mean "the local weather".

=== Time and distance ===
Dummy pronouns are also used with times and distances.

It is used for both time and distance, such as in the phrases "it is seven o'clock" or "it is a long way to the beach".

There can be used for distances, such as in the phrase "there's time to go for a break".

=== Existential there ===
Another common use of dummy pronouns in English is the use of there in existential clauses, such as in the phrase "there are polar bears in Norway." This is also occasionally referred to as the anticipatory there.

This should be distinguished from the locative there, as in "I saw a polar bear over there." This use of there acts as a locative adverb rather than a subject.

While the existential use of there has generally been analyzed as a subject, it has been proposed that elements like expletive there in existential sentences and pro-forms in inverse copular sentences play the role of dummy predicate rather than dummy subject, so that the postverbal noun phrase would rather be the embedded subject of the sentence.

=== Raising verbs ===
Other examples of semantically empty pronouns are found with raising verbs in "unraised" counterparts. For example:

It seems that John loves coffee. (Corresponding "raised" sentence: John seems to love coffee.)

There is a bird flying outside. (Corresponding "raised" sentence: A bird is flying outside.)

=== Extraposition ===
Dummy it can also be found in extraposition constructions in English, a process known as it-extraposition. For example:

It is fun living in Paris. (Corresponding non-extraposed sentence: Living in Paris is fun.)

At least in English, it-extraposition appears much more frequently than non-extraposition.

== Dummy objects ==
In English, dummy object pronouns tend to serve an ad hoc function, applying with less regularity than dummy subjects, though use of the dummy object can be traced at least as far back as the early sixteenth century.

Dummy objects are sometimes used to transform transitive verbs to a transitive light verb form: e.g., do → do it, "to engage in sexual intercourse"; make → make it, "to achieve success"; get → get it, "to comprehend". Prepositional objects are similar: e.g., with it, "up to date"; out of it, "dazed", or "not thinking".

== Other languages ==
German "es gibt" (literally "it gives"), meaning the same as English "there is" or "there are".

== See also ==
- Expletive attributive
- Impersonal verb
- Nonce word
- Null-subject language
- Placeholder name
  - Alice and Bob (placeholder names in cryptography)
  - List of English-language placeholder names for people
  - List of placeholder names
  - Placeholder word
