= Existential closure =

Operation which introduces existential quantification

In formal semantics, existential closure is an operation which introduces existential quantification. It was first posited by Irene Heim in her 1982 dissertation, as part of her analysis of indefinites. In her formulation, existential closure is a form of unselective binding which binds any number of variables of any semantic type. In alternative semantics and related frameworks, the term is often applied to a closely related operation which existentially quantifies over a set of propositional alternatives.

== See also ==
- Alternative semantics
- Irene Heim
- Free variable
- Scope (formal semantics)
