= Indefinite pronoun =

Pronoun without a definite referent

An indefinite pronoun is a pronoun which does not have a specific, familiar referent. Indefinite pronouns are in contrast to definite pronouns.

Indefinite pronouns can represent either count nouns or noncount nouns. They often have related forms across these categories expressing logical quantifiers: universal (such as everyone, everything), assertive existential (such as somebody, something), elective existential (such as anyone, anything), and negative (such as nobody, nothing).

Many languages distinguish forms of indefinites used in affirmative contexts from those used in non-affirmative contexts. For instance, English "something" can be used only in affirmative contexts while "anything" is used otherwise.

Indefinite pronouns are associated with indefinite determiners of a similar or identical form (such as every, any, all, some). A pronoun can be thought of as replacing a noun phrase, while a determiner introduces a noun phrase and precedes any adjectives that modify the noun. Thus, all is an indefinite determiner in "all good boys deserve favour" but a pronoun in "all are happy".

== Table of English indefinite pronoun usage ==
Most indefinite pronouns correspond to discretely singular or plural usage. However, some of them can entail singularity in one context and plurality in another. Pronouns that commonly connote indefiniteness are indicated below, with examples as singular, plural, or singular/plural usage.

=== Table of indefinite pronouns and adverbs ===
| Number | Type | Negative | Universal | Assertive existential | Elective/dubitative existential (Note: Elective existential pronouns are often used with negatives (I can't see anyone), while dubitative existential pronouns are used in questions when there is doubt as to the existence of the pronoun's assumed referent (Is anybody here a doctor?).) |
|---|---|---|---|---|---|
| Singular | Person | no one (also no-one), nobody – No one/Nobody thinks that you are mean. | everyone, everybody – Everyone/Everybody has a cup of coffee. Universal distributive: each – "From each according to his ability, to each according to his needs". | someone, somebody – Someone/Somebody usually fixes that. one - One gets lost without a map. See also generic you. | anyone, anybody – Anyone/Anybody is welcome to submit an entry. whoever (Note: Archaic forms are whosoever, whomsoever.) (nominative case), whomever (oblique case) – Whoever does that will be punished. Give this to whomever needs it most. See also who-. |
| Singular | Thing | nothing – Nothing is true. | everything – Everything is permitted. | something – Something makes me want to dance. | anything – Anything is better than nothing. whichever – Choose whichever is better. See also -ever. |
| Singular | Place | nowhere – Nowhere appeals to me; let's not eat out. | everywhere – Everywhere feels different when traveling. | somewhere – Somewhere is on fire in a Canadian forest right now. | anywhere – Anywhere is better than my place. wherever – Sit wherever you'd like. |
| Singular | Time | never – Never happens twice in life. | forever – Forever makes me crazy. | sometime – Sometime in the past was better than today. | anytime – Anytime is better than never to do it. |
| Dual | | neither (singular) – In the end, neither was selected. | both (plural) – Both were surprised at the other's answer. Both the answers are correct. | | either (singular) – Either is sufficient. |
| Plural | | | others – Others worry about that. | some/most – Some of the biscuits were eaten but most were still there. Are some of you still hungry? Aren't most of you wanting more biscuits? | |
| Singular or plural | | none – None of those people is related to me. None were deemed suitable in the end. (Note: Some traditional style guides state that "none" should always be treated as singular, but the plural sense is well established and widely accepted.) | all – All is lost. All are where they're supposed to be. | such – Such is life. Such are the foibles of humans. | any – Any is too much. If any taste(s) too salty, I apologize. whatever – Play whatever strike(s) your fancy. Whatever is required will be done. |

=== List of quantifier pronouns ===
English has the following quantifier pronouns:

Uncountable (thus, with a singular verb form)

- enough – Enough is enough.
- little – Little is known about this period of history.
- less – Less is known about this period of history.
- much – Much was discussed at the meeting.
- more (also countable, plural) – More is better.
- most (also countable, plural) – Most was rotten. (Usually specified, such as in most of the food.)
- plenty (also countable, plural) – Thanks, that's plenty.

Countable, singular

- one – One has got through. (Often modified or specified, such as in a single one, one of them, etc.)

Countable, plural

- several – Several were chosen.
- few – Few were chosen.
- fewer – Fewer are going to church these days.
- many – Many were chosen.
- more (also uncountable) – More were ignored. (Often specified, such as in more of us.)

=== Possessive forms ===
Some of the English indefinite pronouns above have possessive forms. These are made as for nouns, by adding 's or just an apostrophe following a plural -s (see English possessive).

The most commonly encountered possessive forms of the above pronouns are:

- one's, as in "One should mind one's own business."
- those derived from the singular indefinite pronouns ending in -one or -body: nobody's, someone's, etc. (Those ending -thing can also form possessives, such as nothing's, but these are less common.)
- whoever's, as in "We used whoever's phone that is."
- those derived from other and its variants: the other's, another's, and the plural others': "We should not take others' possessions."
- either's, neither's

Most of these forms are identical to a form representing the pronoun plus -'s as a contraction of is or has. Hence, someone's may also mean someone is or someone has, as well as serving as a possessive.

== Compound indefinite pronouns ==
Two indefinite pronouns can sometimes be used in combination together.

Examples: We should respect each other. People should love one another.

And they can also be made possessive by adding an apostrophe and s.

Examples: We should respect each other's beliefs. We were checking each other's work.

== See also ==
- One (pronoun) – English language, gender-neutral, indefinite pronoun
- Generic you – Use of the pronoun you to refer to an unspecified person
- English personal pronouns – Closed lexical category of the English language
- English grammar § Pronouns
- Numeral (linguistics) – Word or phrase which describes a numerical quantity

== Bibliography ==
- Haspelmath, Martin (1997). Indefinite pronouns. Oxford: Clarendon. doi:10.1093/oso/9780198235606.001.0001. hdl:20.500.12657/30819. ISBN 0-19-829963-X.
- Quirk, Randolph; Greenbaum, Sidney; Leech, Geoffrey; Svartvik, Jan (1985). A Comprehensive Grammar of the English Language. Harlow: Longman. pp. 376–392. ISBN 9780582517349.
- Van Alsenoy, Lauren (2014). New Typology of Indefinite Pronouns, with a Focus on Negative Indefinites (Thesis). University of Antwerp. doi:10.5281/zenodo.8085994.
