= Generic you =

Use of the pronoun you to refer to an unspecified person

In English grammar, the personal pronoun you can often be used in the place of one, the singular impersonal pronoun, in colloquial speech.

== In English ==
The generic you is primarily a colloquial substitute for one. For instance,

"Brushing one's teeth is healthy"

can be expressed less formally as

"Brushing your teeth is healthy."

== Generic pronouns in other languages ==
=== Germanic ===
In German, the informal second-person singular personal pronoun du ("you")—just like in English—is sometimes used in the same sense as the indefinite pronoun man ("one").

In Norwegian, Swedish and Danish, these are also du and man.

In Dutch the informal second-person singular personal pronoun je ("you")—just like in English—is frequently used in the same sense as the indefinite pronoun men ("one").

=== Slavic ===
In Russian, the second person is used for some impersonal constructions. Sometimes with the second-person singular pronoun ты, but often in the pronoun-dropped form. An example is the proverb за двумя зайцами погонишься, ни одного не поймаешь with the literal meaning "if you chase after two hares, you will not catch even one", or figuratively, "a bird in the hand is worth two in the bush".

=== Uralic ===
In Finnish, the second-person pronoun sinä can sometimes be generic, but this use is only recommended in spoken or otherwise informal language. Other constructs are more neutral, such as a verb without a pronoun and in the third person (zero person) or in the passive ("fourth person"), somewhat similar to one in English. The second person is popular largely due to the influence of English. A similar formation, though without the pronoun sinä and therefore only with the second-person possessive suffix -si, can be encountered in some dialects.

=== Arabic ===
In Darija (Arabic as spoken in the Maghreb), there are two distinct singular second-person pronouns, one masculine (used when addressing a man) and one feminine (used when addressing a woman); but when used as generic pronouns, the speaker uses the pronoun with the gender corresponding to their own gender, rather than that of the person they are addressing.

=== Japonic ===
In Japanese, the sentence structure may be adjusted to make the patient of an action, or even the action itself, the topic of a sentence, thus avoiding the use of a pronoun altogether.

== See also ==
- Disputed English grammar – Disputes over "correct" grammar and style
- English personal pronouns – Closed lexical category of the English language
- Gender-neutral pronoun
- Generic antecedent – Representatives of classes in a situation in which gender is typically unknown
- One (pronoun) – English language, gender-neutral, indefinite pronoun
- Singular they – Gender-neutral English pronoun
- Y'all – Contraction of you and all (you all, all of you)
