= Pronouns in English =

Words in English that substitute for a noun or noun phrase

The English pronouns form a relatively small category of words in Modern English whose primary semantic function is that of a pro-form for a noun phrase. Traditional grammars consider them to be a distinct part of speech, while most modern grammars see them as a subcategory of noun, contrasting with common and proper nouns. Still others see them as a subcategory of determiner (see the DP hypothesis). In this article, they are treated as a subtype of the noun category.

They clearly include personal pronouns, relative pronouns, interrogative pronouns, and reciprocal pronouns. Other types that are included by some grammars but excluded by others are demonstrative pronouns and indefinite pronouns. Other members are disputed (see below).

== Overview ==
=== Forms ===
==== Standard ====
Pronouns in formal modern English.

			Nominative	Accusative	Reflexive	Independent genitive	Dependent genitive
First-person	Singular		I	me	myself	mine	my
First-person	Plural		we	us	ourselves	ours	our
Second-person	Singular	Standard	you	you	yourself	yours	your
Second-person	Singular	Poetic/dialectal	thou	thee	thyself	thine	thy
Second-person	Plural		you	you	yourselves	yours	your
Third-person	Singular	Masculine	he	him	himself	his	his
Third-person	Singular	Feminine	she	her	herself	hers	her
Third-person	Singular	Neuter	it	it	itself	its	its
Third-person	Singular	Epicene	they	them	themself themselves	theirs	their
Third-person	Plural		they	them	themselves	theirs	their
Generic			one	one	oneself		one's
Wh-	Relative & interrogative	Personal	who	whom		whose	whose
Wh-	Relative & interrogative	Non-personal	what	what			
Wh-	Relative & interrogative	Non-personal	which	which			
Reciprocal				each other one another		each other's one another's	each other's one another's
Dummy			there it				

==== Full list ====
The full set of pronouns (i.e. personal, relative, interrogative and reciprocal pronouns), along with dummies it and there, of which the status as pronouns is disputed. Nonstandard, informal, and archaic forms are in italics.

			Nominative	Accusative	Reflexive	Independent genitive	Dependent genitive
			(subject)	(object)	(object = subject)	(possessive)	
First person	Singular		I	me	myself	mine	my me (esp. BrE) mine (before vowel, archaic)
First person	Plural		we	us	ourselves ourself	ours	our
Second person	Singular	Standard & archaic formal	you	you	yourself	yours	your
Second person	Singular	Archaic informal	thou	thee	thyself	thine	thy thine (before vowel)
Second person	Plural	Standard	you	you	yourselves	yours	your
Second person	Plural	Archaic	ye	you	yourselves	yours	your
Second person	Plural	Nonstandard	ye y'all youse yinz	ye y'all youse yinz	yeerselves y'all's selves	yeers y'all's	yeer y'all's
Third person	Singular	Masculine	he	him	himself	his	his
Third person	Singular	Feminine	she	her	herself	hers	her
Third person	Singular	Neuter/ impersonal	it	it	itself	its	its
Third person	Singular	Epicene	they	them	themselves/ themself (Note: With a singular antecedent, either themselves or themself may be found; examples of the latter "are very rare and acceptable only to a minority of speakers; the use of this form is, however, likely to increase with the growing acceptance of they as a singular pronoun".)	theirs	their
Third person	Plural		they	them	themselves	theirs	their
Generic/ indefinite	Formal		one	one	oneself		one's
Generic/ indefinite	Informal		you	you	yourself	your	your
Interrogative	Personal		who	whom who		whose	whose
Interrogative	Impersonal		what which	what which		of what of which	of what of which
Relative††	Restrictive or nonrestrictive	Personal	who	whom who^{*}	whoself^{†} whoseself^{†}	whose	whose
Relative††	Restrictive or nonrestrictive	Impersonal	which	which that		whose	whose
Reciprocal				each other one another		each other's one another's	each other's one another's
Dummy			there it				

^{*} Whom and which can be the object of a fronted preposition, but who cannot: The tool with which they sew the dress and The person in whom she confides, but *The person in who she confides. That often cannot be used with a fronted preposition: The book is good, in that it's well written, but *The chair on that she sat. An omitted (∅) pronoun can never be the object of a fronted preposition, but can be the object of a non-fronted preposition: The chair (that) she sat on, but *The chair on (that) she sat.
^{†} Rare
^{††} Except in free or fused relative constructions, in which case what, whatever or whichever is used for a thing and whoever or whomever is used for a person: What he did was clearly impossible, Whoever you married is welcome here (see below).

=== Distinguishing characteristics ===
==== Pro-forms ====
Pronoun is a category of words. A pro-form is not. It is a meaning relation in which a phrase "stands in" for (expresses the same content as) another where the meaning is recoverable from the context. In English, pronouns mostly function as pro-forms, but there are pronouns that are not pro-forms and pro-forms that are not pronouns. Pronouns can be pro-forms for non-noun phrases. For example, in I fixed the bike, which was quite a challenge, the relative pronoun which doesn't stand in for "the bike". Instead, it stands in for the entire proposition "I fixed the bike", a clause, or arguably "fixing the bike", a verb phrase.

Pronouns vs Pro-forms
Example	Pronoun	Pro-form	Explanation
It's a good idea.	Yes	Yes	The pronoun it "stands in" for whatever was mentioned and is a good idea.
I know the people who work there.	Yes	Yes	The relative pronoun who stands in for "the people".
Who works there?	Yes	No	The interrogative pronoun who doesn't stand in for anything.
It's raining.	Yes	No	It is a dummy pronoun, one that doesn't stand in for anything. No other word can function there with the same meaning; we don't say "the sky is raining" or "the weather is raining".
I asked her to help, and she did so right away.	No	Yes	Did so is a verb phrase, but it stands in for "help".
JJ and Petra helped, but the others didn't.	No	Yes	Others is a common noun, not a pronoun, but the others stands in for this list of names of the other people involved.

==== Deixis ====
Most pronouns are deictic: they have no inherent denotation, and their meaning is always contextual. For example, the meaning of me depends entirely on who says it, just as the meaning of you depends on who is being addressed. Pronouns are not the only deictic words though. For example now is deictic, but it's not a pronoun. Also, dummy pronouns and interrogative pronouns are not deictic. In contrast, most noun phrases headed by common or proper nouns are not deictic. For example, a book typically has the same denotation regardless of the situation in which it is said.

==== Syntactic functions ====
English pronouns have all of the functions of other noun phrases:

Functions of NPs with pronouns and other nouns
Function	Non-pronoun	Pronoun
Subject	Jess is here.	She is here.
Object	I have two pens.	I have them.
Object of a preposition	It went to your address.	It went to you.
Predicative complement	This is my brother.	This is him/he.
Determinative	the box's top	its top
Adjunct	Try again Monday.	I did it myself.
Modifier	a Shetland pony	a she goat

On top of this, pronouns can appear in interrogative tags (e.g., that's the one, isn't it?). These tags are formed with an auxiliary verb and a pronoun. Other nouns cannot appear in this construction. This provides justification for categorizing dummy there as a pronoun.

==== Subjects ====
Subject pronouns are typically in nominative form (e.g., She works here.), though independent genitives are also possible (e.g., Hers is better.). In non-finite clauses, however, there is more variety, an example of form-meaning mismatch. In present participial clauses, the nominative, accusative, and dependent genitive are all possible:

- Nominative: Some people, I being one of them, are just not good at it.
- Accusative: Him getting bullied doesn't make him weak.
- Dependent genitive: It worked without our having to do anything at all.

In infinitival clauses, accusative case pronouns function as the subject:

- Accusative: It's not easy for me to change.

==== Object ====
Object pronouns are typically in accusative form (e.g., I saw him.) but may also be reflexive (e.g., She saw herself) or independent genitive (e.g., We've got ours.).

==== Object of a preposition ====
The pronoun object of a preposition is typically in the accusative form but may also be reflexive (e.g., She sent it to herself) or independent genitive (e.g., I hadn't heard of theirs.). With but, than, and as in a very formal register, nominative is also possible (e.g., You're taller than me/I.)

==== Predicative complement ====
A pronoun in predicative complement position is typically in the nominative form. Apart from the verb to be, which usually takes the accusative form in informal styles (e.g., It's me, This is him), but the nominative form in formal styles (e.g., It is I, This is he). However, a predicate complement may also be in the reflexive form (e.g., She isn't herself today) or the independent genitive form (e.g., It's theirs.).

==== Determinative ====
Only genitive pronouns may function as determinatives.

==== Adjunct ====
The most common form for adjuncts is the reflexive (e.g., I did it myself). Independent genitives and accusative are also possible (e.g., Only one matters, mine/me.).

==== Dependents ====
Like proper nouns, but unlike common nouns, pronouns usually resist dependents. They are not always ungrammatical, but they are quite limited in their use:

Dependents in noun phrases headed by pronouns
	Common noun	Pronoun
Determinative	the book	the you you want to be *the you (Note: This article uses asterisks to indicate ungrammatical examples.)
Relative clause	books you have	the you you want to be *you you want to be
Preposition phrase modifier	books from home	*it from home
Adjective phrase modifier	new books	a new you *new them
Nominal modifier	school books	school me is different from home me
Complement	answer to the quiz	*it to the quiz

== Undisputed subtypes ==
=== Personal ===
Personal pronouns are those that participate in the grammatical and semantic systems of person (1st, 2nd, & 3rd person). They are called "personal" pronouns for this reason, and not because they refer to persons, though some do. They typically form definite NPs.

The personal pronouns of modern standard English are presented in the table above. They are I, you, she, he, it, we, and they, and their inflected forms.

The second-person you forms are used with both singular and plural reference. In the Southern United States, y'all (from you all) is used as a plural form, and various other phrases such as you guys are used in other places. An archaic set of second-person pronouns used for singular reference is thou, thee, thyself, thy, thine, which are still used in religious services and can be seen in older works, such as Shakespeare's—in such texts, ye and the you set of pronouns are used for plural reference, or with singular reference as a formal V-form. You can also be used as an indefinite pronoun, referring to a person in general (see generic you), compared to the more formal alternative, one (reflexive oneself, possessive one's).

The third-person singular forms are differentiated according to the gender of the referent. For example, she is used to refer to a woman, sometimes a female animal, and sometimes an object to which feminine characteristics are attributed, such as a ship, car or country. A man, and sometimes a male animal, is referred to using he. In other cases it can be used. (See Gender in English.)

The third-person form they is used with both plural and singular referents. Historically, singular they was restricted to quantificational constructions such as Each employee should clean their desk and referential cases where the referent's gender was unknown. However, it is increasingly used when the referent's gender is irrelevant or when the referent presents as neither man nor woman.

The dependent genitive pronouns, such as my, are used as determinatives together with nouns, as in my old man, some of his friends. The independent genitive forms like mine are used as full noun phrases (e.g., mine is bigger than yours; this one is mine). Note also the construction a friend of mine (meaning "someone who is my friend"). See English possessive for more details.

=== Interrogative ===
The interrogative pronouns are who, whom, whose, which and what (also with the suffix -ever). They are chiefly used in interrogative clauses for the speech act of asking questions. What has impersonal gender, while who, whom and whose have personal gender; they are used to refer to persons. Whom is the accusative form of who (though in most contexts this is replaced by who), while whose is the genitive form. For more information see who.

All the interrogative pronouns can also be used as relative pronouns, though what is quite limited in its use; see below for more details.

=== Relative ===
The main relative pronouns in English are who (with its derived forms whom and whose), and which.

The relative pronoun which refers to things rather than persons, as in the shirt, which used to be red, is faded. For persons, who is used (the man who saw me was tall). The oblique case form of who is whom, as in the man whom I saw was tall, although in informal registers who is commonly used in place of whom.

The possessive form of who is whose (for example, the man whose car is missing); however the use of whose is not restricted to persons (one can say an idea whose time has come). This can be used without a head noun, as in This is Jen, a friend of whose you've already met.

The word that is disputed. Traditionally, it is considered a pronoun, but modern approaches disagree. See below.

The word what can be used to form a free relative clause – one that has no antecedent and that serves as a complete noun phrase in itself, as in I like what he likes. The words whatever and whichever can be used similarly, in the role of either pronouns (whatever he likes) or determiners (whatever book he likes). When referring to persons, who(ever) (and whom(ever)) can be used in a similar way (but not as determiners).

=== Generic ===
A generic pronoun is one with the interpretation of "a person in general". These pronouns cannot have a definite or specific referent, and they "cannot be used as an anaphor to another NP." The generic pronouns are one (e.g., one can see oneself in the mirror) and you (e.g., In Tokugawa Japan, you couldn't leave the country), with one being more formal than you.

=== Reciprocal ===
The English reciprocal pronouns are each other and one another. Although they are written with a space, they're best thought of as single words. No consistent distinction in meaning or use can be found between them. Like the reflexive pronouns, their use is limited to contexts where an antecedent precedes it. In the case of the reciprocals, they need to appear in the same clause as the antecedent.

== Disputed pronouns ==
=== Determiners ===
Today, the English determiners are generally seen as a separate category of words, but they were traditionally viewed as adjectives when they came before a noun (e.g., some people, no books, each book) and as pronouns when they were pro-forms (e.g., I'll have some; I had none, each of the books).

==== What and which ====
As pronouns, what and which have non-personal gender. This means they cannot be used to refer to persons; what is that cannot mean "who is that". But there are also determiners with the same forms. The determiners are not gendered, so they can refer to persons or non-persons (e.g., what genius said that).

Relative which is usually a pronoun, but it can be a determiner in cases like It may rain, in which case we won't go. What is almost never a relative word, but when it is, it is a pronoun (e.g., I didn't see what you took.)

==== Demonstratives ====
The demonstrative pronouns this (plural these), and that (plural those), are a sub-type of determiner in English. Traditionally, they are viewed as pronouns in cases such as these are good; I like that.

==== Indefinites ====
The determiners starting with some-, any, no, and every- and ending with -one, -body, -thing, -place (e.g., someone, nothing) are often called indefinite pronouns, though others consider them to be compound determiners.

The generic pronouns one and the generic use of you are sometimes called indefinite. These are uncontroversial pronouns. Note, however, that English has three words that share the spelling and pronunciation of one.

1. determiner: I have one book; I'll have one too.
2. noun: one plus two is three
3. pronoun: if one considers oneself correct

=== Dummy there ===
The word there is a dummy pronoun in some clauses, chiefly existential (There is no god) and presentational constructions (There appeared a cat on the window sill). The dummy subject takes the number (singular or plural) of the logical subject (complement), hence it takes a plural verb if the complement is plural. In informal English, however, the contraction there's is often used for both singular and plural.

There can undergo inversion, Is there a test today? and Never has there been a man such as this. It can also appear without a corresponding logical subject, in short sentences and question tags: There wasn't a discussion, was there?

The word there in such sentences has sometimes been analyzed as an adverb, or as a dummy predicate, rather than as a pronoun. However, its identification as a pronoun is most consistent with its behavior in inverted sentences and question tags as described above.

Because the word there can also be a deictic adverb (meaning "at that place"), a sentence like There is a river could have either of two meanings: "a river exists" (with there as a pronoun), and "a river is in that place" (with there as an adverb). In speech, the adverbial there would be given stress, while the pronoun would not – in fact, the pronoun is often pronounced as a weak form, /ðə(r)/.

=== Yesterday, today, and tomorrow ===
These words are sometimes classified as nouns (e.g., Tomorrow should be a nice day), and sometimes as adverbs (I'll see you tomorrow). But they are alternatively classified as pronouns in both of these examples. In fact, these words have most of the characteristics of pronouns (see above). In particular, they are pro-forms, and they resist most dependents (e.g., *a good today).

=== Relative that ===
Traditional grammars classify that as a relative pronoun. Most modern grammars disagree, calling it a subordinator or a complementizer.

Relative that is normally found only in restrictive relative clauses (unlike which and who, which can be used in both restrictive and unrestrictive clauses). It can refer to either persons or things, and cannot follow a preposition. For example, one can say the song that [or which] I listened to yesterday, but the song to which [not to that] I listened yesterday. Relative that is usually pronounced with a reduced vowel (schwa), and hence differently from the demonstrative that (see Weak and strong forms in English). If that is not the subject of the relative clause (in the traditional view), it can be omitted (the song I listened to yesterday).

=== Other pro-forms ===
There is some confusion about the difference between a pronoun and a pro-form. For example, some sources make claims such as the following:

We can use other as a pronoun. As a pronoun, other has a plural form, others:

- We have to solve this problem, more than any other, today
- I’ll attach two photos to this email and I’ll send others tomorrow.

But other is just a common noun here. Unlike pronouns, it readily takes a determiner (many others) or a relative clause modifier (others that we know).

== Old English ==
=== Interrogative pronouns ===
Hwā ("who") and hwæt ("what") follow natural gender, not grammatical gender: as in Modern English, hwā is used with people, hwæt with things. However, that distinction only matters in the nominative and accusative cases, as they are identical in other cases:

Declension of hwā and hwæt
	"who"	"what"
Nominative	hwā	hwæt
Accusative	hwone	hwæt
Genitive	hwæs	
Dative	hwām	
Instrumental	hwon, hwȳ	

Hwelċ ("which" or "what kind of") is inflected like an adjective. Same with hwæðer, which also means "which" but is only used between two alternatives:

Old English	Hwæðer wēnst þū is māre, þē þīn sweord þē mīn?
Translation	Which one do you think is bigger, your sword or mine?

=== Personal pronouns ===
The first- and second-person pronouns are the same for all genders. They also have special dual forms, which are only used for groups of two things, as in "we both" and "you two." The dual forms are common, but the ordinary plural forms can always be used instead when the meaning is clear.

Personal pronouns
Case	1st person			2nd person			3rd person			
Case	Singular	Dual	Plural	Singular	Dual	Plural	Singular			Plural
Case	Singular	Dual	Plural	Singular	Dual	Plural	Feminine	Masculine	Neuter	Plural
Nominative	iċ	wit	wē	þū	ġit	ġē	hēo	hē	hit	hīe
Accusative	mē	unc	ūs	þē	inc	ēow	hīe	hine	hit	hīe
Dative	mē	unc	ūs	þē	inc	ēow	hire	him		
Genitive	mīn	uncer	ūre	þīn	incer	ēower	hire	his		heora

Many of the forms above bear a strong resemblance to the Modern English words they eventually became. For instance, in the genitive case, ēower became "your," ūre became "our," and mīn became "my." However, the plural third-person personal pronouns were all replaced with Old Norse forms during the Middle English period, yielding "they," "them," and "their."

== Middle English ==
Middle English personal pronouns were mostly developed from those of Old English, with the exception of the third-person plural, a borrowing from Old Norse (the original Old English form clashed with the third person singular and was eventually dropped). Also, the nominative form of the feminine third-person singular was replaced by a form of the demonstrative that developed into sche (modern she), but the alternative heyr remained in some areas for a long time.

As with nouns, there was some inflectional simplification (the distinct Old English dual forms were lost), but pronouns, unlike nouns, retained distinct nominative and accusative forms. Third-person pronouns also retained a distinction between accusative and dative forms, but that was gradually lost: the masculine hine was replaced by him south of the Thames by the early 14th century, and the neuter dative him was ousted by it in most dialects by the 15th.

The following table shows some of the various Middle English pronouns. Many other variations are noted in Middle English sources because of differences in spellings and pronunciations at different times and in different dialects.

Middle English personal pronouns
Personal pronouns	1st person		2nd person		3rd person			
Personal pronouns	Singular	Plural	Singular	Plural	Singular			Plural
Personal pronouns	Singular	Plural	Singular	Plural	Masculine	Neuter	Feminine	Plural
Nominative	ic, ich, I	we	þeou, þ(o)u, tu	ye	he	hit	s(c)he(o)	he(o)/ þei
Accusative	mi	(o)us	þe	eow, eou, yow, gu, you	hine	hit	heo, his, hi(r)e	his/ þem
Dative	mi	(o)us	þe	eow, eou, yow, gu, you	him	him	heo, his, hi(r)e	heo(m), þo/ þem
Possessive	min(en)	(o)ure, ures, ure(n)	þi, ti	eower, yower, gur, eour	his, hes	his	heo(re), hio, hire	he(o)re/ þeir
Genitive	min, mire, minre	oures	þin, þyn	youres	his	his	heo(re), hio, hire	he(o)re/ þeir
Reflexive	min one, mi selven	us self, ous-silve	þeself, þi selven	you-self/ you-selve	him-selven	hit-sulve	heo-seolf	þam-selve/ þem-selve
