= She (pronoun) =

Singular, feminine, third-person pronoun

In Modern English, she is a singular, feminine, third-person pronoun.

== Morphology ==
In Standard Modern English, she has four shapes representing five distinct word forms:

- she: the nominative (subjective) form
- her: the accusative (objective, also called the 'oblique') form; the dependent genitive (possessive) form
- hers: the independent genitive form
- herself: the reflexive form

== History ==
Old English had a single third-person pronoun – from the Proto-Germanic demonstrative base *khi-, from PIE *ko- 'this' – which had a plural and three genders in the singular. In early Middle English, one case was lost, and distinct pronouns started to develop. The modern pronoun it developed out of the neuter, singular in the 12th century. Her developed out of the feminine singular dative and genitive forms. The older pronoun had the following forms:

Old English, third-person pronoun
Case	Singular			Plural
Case	Masculine	Neuter	Feminine	Plural
Nominative	hē	hit	hēo	hī(e)
Accusative	hine	hit	hīe	hī(e)
Dative	him	him	hire	him / heom
Genitive	his	his	hire	hira / heora

The evolution of she is disputed. By Middle English, it was found in the form schē [ʃeː], (Note: The pronunciation of /eː/ would later change to /iː/ in the Great Vowel Shift.) but how it arrived there is unclear. Some sources propose it evolved from the demonstrative pronoun:

[...] probably evolving from Old English seo, sio (accusative sie), fem. of demonstrative pronoun (masc. se) 'the', from PIE root *so- 'this, that' (see the).

Others propose it descends directly from the third-person feminine pronoun:

In Middle English, the Old English system collapses, due to the gradual loss of þe and the replacement of the paradigm se, seo, þæt by indeclinable that.

A more likely account is what is sometimes called the 'Shetland Theory', since it assumes a development parallel to that of Shetland < OScand. Hjaltland, Shapinsay < Hjalpandisey, etc. The starting point is the morphologically and chronologically preferable hēo. Once again we have syllabicity shift and vowel reduction, giving [heo̯] > [he̯o] > [hjoː]. Then [hj-] > [ç-], and [ç-] > [ʃ-], giving final [ʃoː].

This does not lead to the modern form she /ʃiː/.

So any solution that gets [ʃ] from /eo/ also needs to 'correct' the resultant /oː/ (outside the north) to /eː/. This means an analogical transfer of (probably) the /eː/ of he.

None of this is entirely plausible.

The -self forms developed in early Middle English, with hire self becoming herself. By the 15th century, the Middle English forms of she had solidified into those we use today.

== Gender ==
Historically, she was encompassed in he as he had three genders in Old English. The neuter and feminine genders split off during Middle English. Today, she is the only feminine pronoun in English.

She is rarely used as a gender neutral, third-person, singular pronoun (see also singular they).

== Syntax ==
=== Functions ===
She can appear as a subject, object, determiner or predicative complement. The reflexive form also appears as an adjunct. She occasionally appears as a modifier in a noun phrase.

- Subject: She's there; her being there; she paid for herself to be there.
- Object: I saw her; I introduced him to her; She saw herself.
- Predicative complement: The only person there was her.
- Dependent determiner: This is her book.
- Independent determiner: This is hers.
- Adjunct: She did it herself.
- Modifier: The she goat was missing.

=== Dependents ===
Pronouns rarely take dependents, but it is possible for she to have many of the same kind of dependents as other noun phrases.

- Relative clause modifier: she who arrives late
- Determiner: A: Somebody was here, and she left this. B: I'm that she.
- Adjective phrase modifier: the real her
- Adverb phrase external modifier: Not even her

== Semantics ==
She's referents are generally limited to individual, female persons, excluding the speaker and the addressee. She is always definite and usually specific.

=== Generic ===
The pronoun she can also be used to refer to an unspecified person, as in If you see someone in trouble, help her. (Note: See § Gender, above.)

- If either your mother or father would like to discuss it, I'll talk to her.

=== Non-human she ===
She has traditionally been used for ships, but can also be used for other inanimate objects as a form of anthropomorphism.

- SS Edmund Fitzgerald was an American Great Lakes freighter that sank in Lake Superior during a storm. When launched in 1958, she was the largest ship on North America's Great Lakes.
- "I know, I know ... It's Eleanor ... Just take her, slick." ―Gone in 60 Seconds (2000 film)

She can also be used for countries as political entities, but not as geographical entities.

- Canada really found her place in the world during WWII.
- Canada's prairies are grassland, and she has five great lakes in Ontario.

Many English style guides discourage the use of she for countries or inanimate objects; such use may be considered dated or sexist.

=== Deities ===
"She" may refer to a particular goddess or to a monotheistic God when regarded as female. In this case it may be written "She" with reverential capitalization.

== Other ==
In 1999, she was selected as the word of the millennium by the American Dialect Society.

== See also ==
- Personal pronouns in English
- Third-person pronoun
