= Inanimate whose =

English grammatical construction

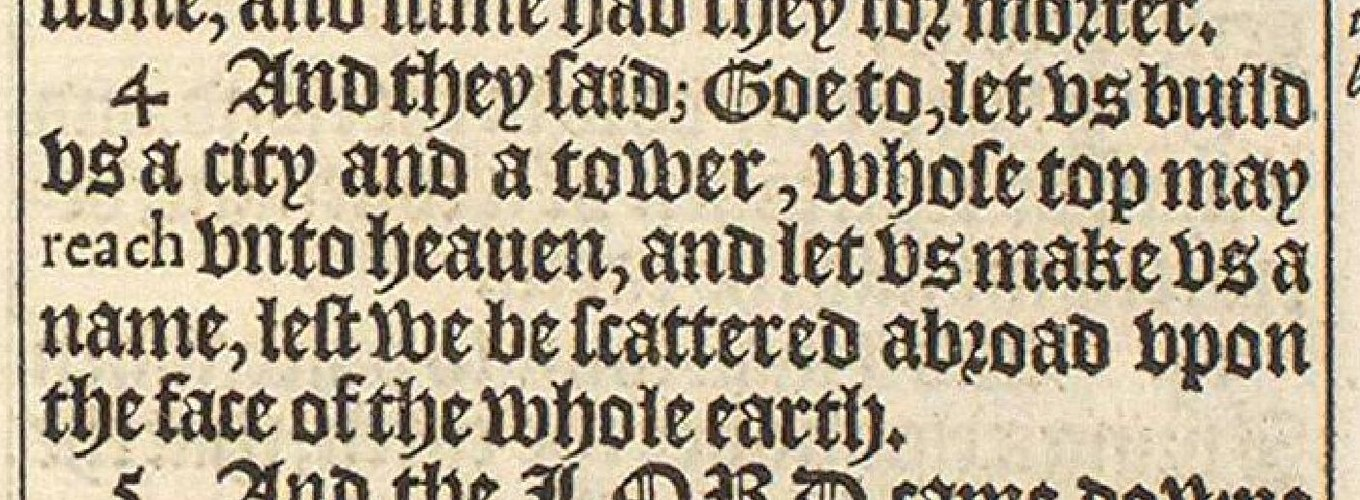
The inanimate whose appears in such works as the King James Version of the Bible: "And they said; Goe to, let us build us a city and a tower, whose top may reach unto heaven, and let us make us a name, lest we be scattered abroad upon the face of the whole earth." (Genesis 11:4)

The inanimate whose refers to the use in English of the relative pronoun whose with non-personal antecedents, as in: "That's the car whose alarm keeps waking us up at night." The construction is also known as the whose inanimate, non-personal whose, and neuter whose.

The use of the inanimate whose dates from the 15th century, but since the 18th century has drawn criticism from those who consider whose to be the genitive (possessive) only of the relative pronoun who and therefore believe it should be restricted to personal antecedents. Critics of inanimate whose prefer constructions such as those using of which the, which others find clumsy or overly formal.

== Usage ==
Users of the inanimate whose employ it as a relative pronoun with non-personal antecedents, as in:

"That's the car whose alarm keeps waking us up at night."

Those who avoid using whose with non-personal antecedents assert that it is the genitive (possessive) of only the relative pronoun who. They employ alternatives such as of which the, as in:

"That's the car of which the alarm keeps waking us up at night."

or

"That's the car the alarm of which keeps waking us up at night."

Those who object to this use of of which the find it clunky or overly formal.

In some dialects, thats has developed as a colloquial genitive relative pronoun for non-personal antecedents, as in:

"That's the car thats alarm keeps waking us up at night."

The inanimate whose is restricted to the relative pronoun. English speakers do not use whose as a non-personal interrogative possessive: the whose in "Whose car is this?" can refer only to a person.

== Etymology and history ==
The Old English genitive of the neuter pronoun hwæt ('what') was hwæs, which later evolved as whose into the genitive of which. The first recorded instance of inanimate relative whose occurs in 1479, about 50 years after the first example of relative who. There is not a great deal of data for the preceding centuries, so it is difficult to pin down its evolution. Attested usage is common in Early Modern English, with inanimate whose appearing repeatedly in the works of Shakespeare, in the King James Bible, and in the writings of Milton and others.

Old English had grammatical gender, and pronouns agreed with the grammatical gender of the nouns they referred to, regardless of the noun's innate gender. For example, the Old English wīf ('wife') was neuter and referred to with the pronoun hit ('it'), and wīfmann ('woman') was masculine and referred to with the pronoun hē ('he'). English lost grammatical gender during the late Middle Ages, and the pronouns he and she came to refer to animate subjects of male (or indeterminate) and female biological gender, and it came to refer to inanimate subjects. The American philologist George Perkins Marsh posited that this animate–inanimate distinction led to an eventual discomfort with using whose to refer to both. In contrast, Richard Hogg speculates that causality is the other way around.

== Grammars and style guides ==
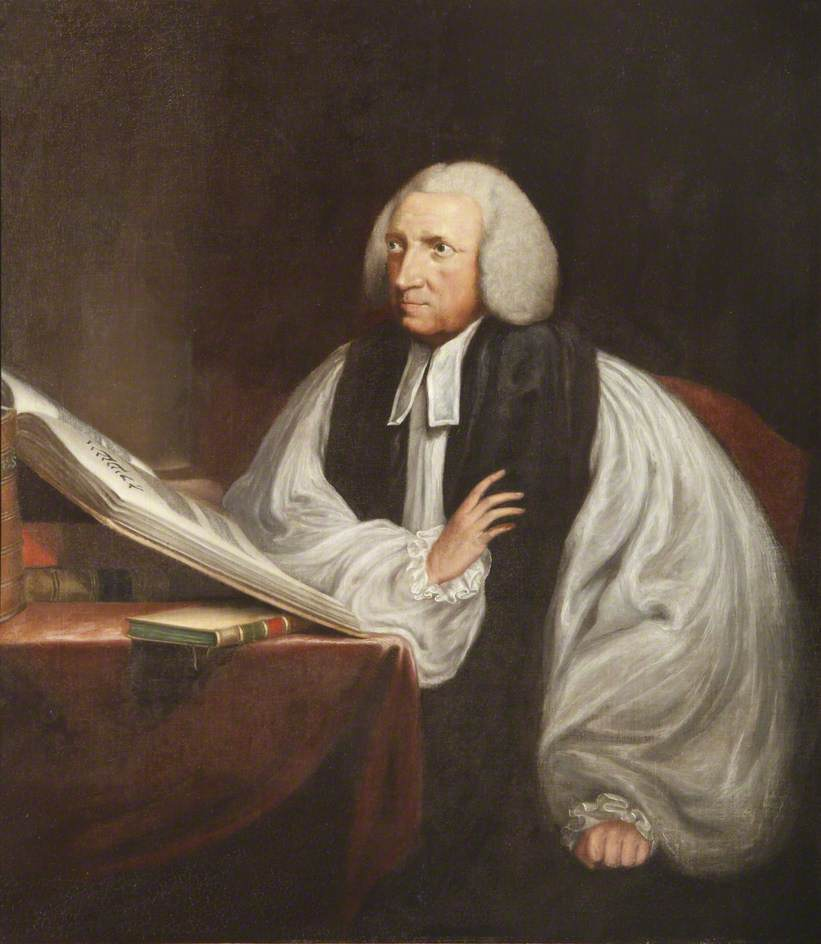
Robert Lowth's is the oldest known objection to use of the inanimate whose.

The earliest known objections to the inanimate whose date from the late 18th century. In 1764, the English grammarian Robert Lowth disapproved of the inanimate whose except in "the higher Poetry, which loves to consider everything as bearing a personal character". The English James Buchanan in his Regular English Syntax of 1767 considered inanimate whose an incorrect construction that occurs "in the lower kind of poetry and prose", but accepted it in "solemn poetry" when used for personification. In his Plain and Complete Grammar of 1772, Anselm Bayly accepted use of the inanimate whose. The English grammarian Joseph Priestley wrote that whose "may be said to be the genitive of which", but objected to such use in the 3rd edition of The Rudiments of English Grammar in 1772: "The word whose begins likewise to be restricted to persons, but it is not done so generally but that good writers, and even in prose, use it when speaking of things. I do not think, however, that the construction is generally pleasing."

In the 6th edition of his A Dictionary of the English Language (1785), Samuel Johnson considered whose "rather the poetic than the regular genitive of which". The American grammarian Lindley Murray wrote of the inanimate whose in his English Grammar of 1795, but his position on it is uncertain; he reprinted Priestly's opinion but also stated: "By the use of this license, one word is substituted for three". Other grammarians soon thereafter pronounced their disapproval, including Noah Webster in 1798.

More grammarians continued such disapproval into the 19th century. T. O. Churchill declared in A New Grammar of the English Language of 1823 that "this practice is now discountenanced by all correct writers". The American philologist George Perkins Marsh stated in his Lectures on the English Language of 1860: "At present, the use of whose, the possessive of who, is pretty generally confined to persons, or things personified, and we should scruple to say, 'I passed a house whose windows were open.' This is a modern, and indeed by no means yet fully established distinction." Henry Bradley in the Oxford English Dictionary asserted "usually replaced by of which, except where the latter would produce an intolerably clumsy form".

Other grammarians began noticing discrepancies between usage and the assertions of those who prescribed against the inanimate whose. The American Goold Brown, in his The Grammar of English Grammars of 1851, stated that whose "is sometimes used to supply the place of the possessive case, otherwise wanting, to the relative which"; he cited a number of cases of its use and of those who prescribe against it and their rationales, and concluded: "Grammarians would perhaps differ less, if they read more." In The Standard of Usage in English of 1908, the American literary historian Thomas Lounsbury asserted that the inanimate whose "had been employed as a relative to antecedents denoting things without life by every author in our literature who is entitled to be called an authority". John Lesslie Hall published his research on the subject in his English Usage of 1917; he discovered over 1000 passages by about 140 authors from the 15th to the 20th centuries that used the inanimate whose, including use by those who had objected to it or declared its use rare. Hall considered "authors that avoid whose ... a small minority" and stated that using of which the in its place was rare in spoken American English.

In his A Dictionary of Modern English Usage of 1926, H. W. Fowler derided those who prescribed against the inanimate whose, writing: "in the starch that stiffens English style one of the most effective ingredients is the rule that whose shall refer only to persons"; he asserted that the alternative adds flexibility to style and proclaimed: "Let us, in the name of common sense, prohibit the prohibition of inanimate whose". The revised versions of that style guide by Robert Burchfield (1996) and Jeremy Butterfield (2015) called the avoidance of the inanimate whose a "folk-belief". In his Plain Words of 1954, Ernest Gowers calls the "grammarians' rule" that whose "must not be used of inanimate objects ... a cramping one, productive of ugly sentences and a temptation to misplaced commas". He states that "sensible writers have always ignored the rule, and sensible grammarians have now abandoned it".

A survey conducted by Sterling A. Leonard in 1932 found that respondents considered the use of inanimate whose established; Raymond D. Crisp replicated the survey in 1971 and found that respondents considered the usage disputable. Mary Vaiana Taylor reported in 1974 that two-thirds of post-secondary teaching assistants would still mark the construction wrong on a student's paper.

Merriam–Webster's Dictionary of English Usage states that, amongst "the current books" that discussed the subject as of the late 20th century, "not one of them finds [inanimate] whose anything but standard". To the assertions of early grammarians, that dictionary counters that "[i]ts common occurrence in poetry undoubtedly owes more to its graceful quality than to any supposed love of personification among poets" and that its usage "is perhaps more likely to occur in the works of good writers than bad ones". It asserts that "notion that whose may not properly be used of anything except persons is a superstition" and such use is "entirely standard as an alternative to of which in all varieties of discourse". In Modern American Usage, Bryan A. Garner calls the inanimate whose "often an inescapable way of avoiding clumsiness". The Cambridge Grammar of the English Language emphasizes that such "genitives ... are completely grammatical and by no means exceptional", with a note that "a number of usage manuals feel it necessary to point out that relative whose can have a non-personal antecedent: there are apparently some speakers who are inclined to think that it is restricted to personal antecedents". The 16th edition of The Chicago Manual of Style (2010) states that the construction is "widely accepted as preventing unnecessary awkwardness" and "lends greater smoothness" to prose than of which.
