= English relative clauses =

English grammatical clause type

Relative clauses in the English language are formed principally by means of relative words. The basic relative pronouns are who, which, and that; who also has the derived forms whom and whose. Various grammatical rules and style guides determine which relative pronouns may be suitable in various situations, especially for formal settings. In some cases the relative pronoun may be omitted and merely implied ("This is the man [that] I saw", or "This is the putter he wins with").

English also uses free relative clauses, which have no antecedent and can be formed with the pronouns such as what ("I like what you've done"), and who and whoever.

Modern guides to English say that the relative pronoun should take the case (subject or object) which is appropriate to the relative clause, not the function performed by that clause within an external clause.

== Overview ==
The basic grammatical rules for the formation of relative clauses in English are given here. More details can be found in the article on who.

1. The basic relative pronouns are considered to be who, which and that, but an alternative analysis of that as a relativizer is presented in a succeeding section.
2. The relative pronoun comes at the very start of the relative clause unless it is preceded by a fronted preposition: "The bed on which I was lying". (It is normal to slide the preposition to the end of the clause and leave it stranded, or dangling: "The bed which I was lying on"). The relative clause may start with a larger phrase containing the relative pronoun after a preposition: "The bed, the owner of which we had seen previously, ...", or "The bed, lying on which was a small cat, ..."
3. who is used only with its antecedent referring to a person ("The man who ..."); which, referring to a thing ("The flowers which ..."); that, referring to either a person or thing ("The woman that ...", or "The flowers that ...").
4. that is used only in restrictive relative clauses, and is not preceded by a comma ("The teacher that looks worn-out", or "The car that looks worn-out"); but who and which may be used in both restrictive and non-restrictive clauses, and may or may not take a comma ("The teacher who looks worn-out", or "My teacher, who ..."), and ("The car which looks worn-out", or "My car, which ..."). In some styles of formal English, particularly American, using which in restrictive clauses is avoided where possible (see that or which below).
5. whom is used only when its antecedent is the object of the relative clause, but not when its antecedent is the subject of the relative clause ("The officer nabbed the thief whom I saw")—antecedent thief is the object of the relative clause; but not (*The officer nabbed the thief whom saw me)—here the antecedent thief is the subject of the relative clause ("... the thief _ saw me"); who is correct here.
6. When a preposition in the relative clause is placed in front (fronted), only whom or which is used ("The waiter to whom I spoke", or "The putter with which she wins"); it would never be acceptable to use who (*The waiter to who I spoke) or that (*The putter with that she wins). With informal style, the preposition is often dangled (or stranded), not fronted, so who and that may also be used (“The mailman who I spoke to”, “The mailman that I spoke to”, as well as “The mailman whom ...”); and (“The putter that she wins with”, or “The putter which ...”), or the zero relative pronoun is frequently used (“The putter she wins with”). (See Zero relative pronoun).
7. When that is used in a restrictive relative clause and it is not the subject of the relative clause, it may be omitted entirely. For example: ("The dentist that I saw" or "The dentist that I spoke to") may be rendered simply ("The dentist I saw" or "The dentist I spoke to"). But any relative pronoun when used in a non-restrictive relative clause must not be omitted ("My dentist, whom I saw", or "My dentist, who spoke to me"); nor when its preposition is fronted ("The dentist to whom I spoke"); nor when its antecedent is the subject of the relative clause ("The dentist that saw me”, or “The dentist who saw me").
8. The verb in a relative clause takes the same person (first, second, or third) and number (singular or plural) as that of the antecedent of the relative pronoun. In ("The people who were present ...") the antecedent of who is people (third person, plural), so the verb to be takes its form (were) for third person and plural number; in ("I, who am normally very tolerant, ...") who‘s antecedent is the pronoun I (first person, singular), so the verb to be takes its form (am) for first person and singular number.
9. whose indicates that the antecedent has a possessive role in the relative clause ("The man whose daughter I married"). Unlike who, it can refer to things as well as persons ("I found a car whose battery was dead"). Though there is some reluctance to use whose with a non-personal antecedent, such use is not uncommon and is perfectly grammatical. Whose is used in both restrictive and non-restrictive clauses (“The woman whose brother was recently married ...”, or "Sally, whose brother ...") and with both fronted and stranded prepositions ("The student in whose car we arrived ...", "The student whose car we arrived in ...") or larger phrases with a preposition ("My tutor, some of whose lessons...").
10. A relative clause whose antecedent is a whole proposition—that is, a matter (or person or thing) to be dealt with—is formed with which ("The cake was burnt, which made me angry"); here which refers to the whole circumstance of the cake's being burnt.
11. A formal, though uncommon, use of which is its being a relative determiner in non-restrictive clauses ("He painted a picture of the house, which painting I later destroyed"). Here, which may refer to persons as well as things (“Yesterday, I met three men with long beards, which men I remember vividly”). Which can also refer to the whole clause, followed by a word that represents the ideas of the clause ("Yesterday, I met three men with long beards, which meetings I remember vividly"). A preposition may be fronted in front of the relative determiner which ("Every day, he visits me at the arcade, from which fact I derive much pleasure"), as may a larger phrase containing a preposition ("He went to the park and the shopping center, both of which places ...").
12. A free relative clause has no antecedent and takes the role of an argument in the main clause. When referring to people, it is formed with the pronouns who, whom or whoever, whomever ("I'll take who you choose", or "I'll take whom you choose", or "I'll take whoever (or whomever) you choose"). When referring to things, it is formed with the pronouns what or whatever ("What I said annoyed her") where what stands for "the thing which ..." or "that which ...". Whichever is used when referring to people or things from a known set. (These are all called compound relative pronouns.) Also, there are the determiner (adjectival) equivalents which or what, or more usually, whichever or whatever ("I'll take whichever dish you choose", or "I'll take whatever dish you choose").

The words used as relative pronouns have other uses in English grammar: that can be a demonstrative or a conjunction, while which, what, who, whom and whose can be interrogatives. For other uses of whoever etc., see -ever.

== Variables in the basic relative clause ==
=== Human or non-human antecedents ===
The choice of relative pronoun typically depends on whether the antecedent is human or non-human: for example, who and its derivatives (whom, whoever, etc.—apart from whose) are generally restricted to human antecedents, while which and what and their derivatives refer in most cases to things, including animals.

The relative pronoun that is used with both human and non-human antecedents. Some writers and style guides recommend reserving that for non-human cases only, but this view does not reflect general use. Counter-examples can be found in literature: Shakespeare (the man that hath no music in himself, in The Merchant of Venice), Mark Twain (The Man that Corrupted Hadleyburg), and Ira Gershwin (The Man that Got Away); and informal English, especially speech, follows an actual practice (in using that and which) that is more natural than prescriptivist.

The possessive form whose is necessarily used with non-human as well as human antecedents because no possessive forms exist for which or that. Otherwise, to avoid, for example, using whose in "...the car whose engine blew up.." would require a periphrastic phrasing, such as "...the car the engine of which blew up", or "...the car of which the engine blew up".

English also makes the distinction between human vs. thing in personal pronouns (he, she vs. it) and certain other pronouns (such as someone, somebody vs. something); but some particular things—such a navy ships and marine vessels—are described with female pronouns, and pets and other animals are frequently addressed in terms of their gender or their (anthropomorphic) ‘personhood’. Typically, it is when these things-as-human become antecedents to relative clauses that their relative pronouns tend to revert to that or which—for things—rather than taking the regular who, whom, etc., for human referents. See Gender in English.

=== Restrictive or non-restrictive relative clauses ===
The distinction between restrictive, or integrated, relative clauses and non-restrictive, or supplementary, relative clauses in English is made both in speaking (through prosody), and in writing (through punctuation): a non-restrictive relative clause is surrounded by pauses in speech and usually by commas in writing, whereas a restrictive clause is not. Compare the following sentences, which have quite different meanings and intonation, depending on whether the commas are inserted:

(1) The builder, who erects very fine houses, will make a large profit. (non-restrictive)
(2) The builder who erects very fine houses will make a large profit. (restrictive)

The first expression refers to an individual builder (and it implies that we know, or know of, the builder, which is the referent). It says that he builds "very fine" houses, and that he will make a large profit. It conveys these meanings by deploying a non-restrictive relative clause and three short intonation curves, usually marked-off by commas. The second expression refers not to a single builder but to a certain category, also called a set, of builders who meet a particular qualification, or distinguishing property: the one explained by the restrictive relative clause. Now the sentence means: it is the builder who builds "very fine" houses who will make a large profit. It conveys this very different meaning by providing a restrictive relative clause and only one intonation curve, and no commas. Commas are, however, often used erroneously, probably because the rule is taught based on logic and most people are not aware that they can trust their ear in deciding whether to use a comma. (English uses commas in some other cases based on grammar, not prosody.)

Thus, in speaking or writing English prose, a restrictive rather than non-restrictive meaning (or vice versa) requires the correct syntax by choosing the appropriate relative clause (i.e., restrictive or non-restrictive) and the appropriate intonation and punctuation.

To determine whether a relative clause is restrictive or non-restrictive a simple test can be applied. If the basic meaning of the sentence (the thought) is not changed by removing the relative clause, the relative clause is not essential to the basic thought and is non-restrictive. Alternatively, if the essential meaning of the thought is disturbed, the relative clause is restrictive.

Restrictive relative clauses are also called integrated relative clauses, defining relative clauses, or identifying relative clauses. Conversely, non-restrictive relative clauses are called supplementary, appositive, non-defining, or non-identifying relative clauses.

Also, some integrated clauses may not be truly restrictive; see integrated clauses, and for more information see restrictiveness.

==== Integrated clauses that are not restrictive ====
Although the term "restrictive" has become established as joined with integrated clauses, there are integrated clauses that do not necessarily express a distinguishing property of the referent. Such a (so-called) restrictive clause, actually a non-restrictive clause, is so completely integrated into the narrative and the intonation of the main sentence that it falsely appears to be restrictive.

These examples of integrated relative clauses in that sense are not truly restrictive:

- "The father who had planned my life to the point of my unsought arrival in Brighton took it for granted that in the last three weeks of his legal guardianship I would still act as he directed."
- "He sounded like the clergyman [that] he was."

(The Cambridge Grammar of the English Language)

When the "restrictive" relative clause is removed from either of the above sentences, the antecedent ("the father" and "the clergyman") is not placed in question. In the first example, for instance, there is no suggestion that the narrator has two fathers because the relative clause does not express a distinguishing property of the subject. Instead, the relative clause is integrated but is not truly restrictive.

==== That or which for non-human antecedents ====
The distinction between the relative pronouns that and which to introduce restrictive relative clauses with non-human antecedents is a frequent point of dispute.

For clarity, the case of non-human antecedents using the previous example can be examined:

1. The building company, which erects very fine houses, will make a large profit. (non-restrictive)
2. The building company that (or which) erects very fine houses will make a large profit. (restrictive)

Of the two, it is consensus that only which is commonly used in non-restrictive clauses.

The dispute concerns restrictive clauses. Both that and which are commonly used. However, for "polished" prose, many American style guides, such as the 16th edition of The Chicago Manual of Style, recommend generally avoiding which in restrictive relative clauses. This prescriptive "rule" was proposed as early as 1851 by Goold Brown. It was championed in 1926 by H. W. Fowler, who said: "If writers would agree to regard that as the defining [restrictive] relative pronoun, and which as the non-defining, there would be much gain both in lucidity and in ease. There are some who follow this principle now, but it would be idle to pretend that it is the practice either of most or of the best writers." Linguists, according to Stanford linguist Arnold Zwicky, generally regard the proposed rule on not using which in restrictive relative clauses as "a really silly idea".

Which cannot correctly be replaced by that in a restrictive relative clause when the relative pronoun is the object of a non-stranded (or non-dangling) preposition. In this case which is used, as in "We admired the skill with which she handled the situation." (The example is taken from The Cambridge Grammar of the English Language.)

=== Zero relative pronoun ===
English, unlike other West Germanic languages, has a zero relative pronoun (denoted below as ∅)—that is, the relative pronoun is implied and not explicitly written or spoken; it is "unvoiced". This measure is used in restrictive relative clauses (only) as an alternative to voicing that, which or who, whom, etc. in these clauses:

Jack built the house that I was born in;
Jack built the house ∅ I was born in;

He is the person whom I saw;
He is the person ∅ I saw.

In other words, the word "that" (or "who" or "which", etc.) as a relative clause connector is optional when it would not be the subject of the relative clause; even when it would be required in other languages.

The zero relative pronoun cannot be the subject of the verb in the relative clause; that is, that or who, etc., cannot be omitted (unvoiced) if the zero pronoun would be a subject. Thus one may say:

Jack built the house that sits on the hill;
She is the one who encouraged me;

but never (except in some varieties of colloquial English):

*Jack built the house ∅ sits on the hill;
*She is the one ∅ encouraged me.

Neither the unvoiced zero pronoun nor that can be used in non-restrictive relative clauses (that is, yes: "Jack, who builds houses, built the house she lives in", but never: "Jack, that builds houses, built … "), nor in any relative clause with a fronted preposition (yes: "Jack built the house in which we live", but never: "Jack built the house in that we live"). But either can be used when the preposition is stranded, or dangled, ("Jack built the house that we live in," or "Jack built the house we live in.")

Relative clauses headed by zeros are frequently called contact clauses in TEFL contexts, and may also be called "zero clauses".

(If that is analyzed as a complementizer rather than as a relative pronoun the above sentences would be represented differently: Jack built the house that I was born in ∅; Jack built the house I was born in ∅; He is the person I saw ∅.

=== 'What' relative pronoun ===
Some varieties of English use what as a relative pronoun. For example, in Guardians of the Galaxy Vol. 2, a Ravager says, "For it is a name what strikes fear into the hearts of anyone what hears it."

What as a relative pronoun appeared on the front-page of United Kingdom newspaper The Sun on 11 April 1992 in the headline "It's The Sun Wot Won It."

Standard Englishes proscribe the use of what as a relative pronoun, preferring who or that.

=== Relative pronoun as the object of a preposition ===
A relative pronoun often appears as the object of a preposition, both in restrictive and non-restrictive clauses, as in

"Jack is the boy with whom Jenny fell in love."

or

"Yesterday, Jenny met Jack, for whom she no longer has any feelings."

It is not unusual to place the preposition at the end of the relative clause, while the relative pronoun that it governs is placed at the beginning of the clause or omitted, so

"Jack is the boy that Jenny fell in love with."

is also possible. A preposition is never placed in front of the relative pronoun that, but preposition stranding is possible when there is an explicit that, or when the relative pronoun representing the object of the clause is omitted. So

"Jack is the boy that Jenny fell in love with."

and

"Jack is the boy Jenny fell in love with."

are possible but

*"Jack is the boy with that Jenny fell in love."

is ungrammatical.

Such preposition-stranding is perfectly grammatical and has been used by the best writers for centuries, though it was, in the past, criticized by prescriptivist grammarians as being either ungrammatical or informal.

The grammatical case of a relative pronoun governed by a preposition is the same as when it is the direct object of a verb: typically the objective case. When the relative pronoun follows the preposition, the objective case is required, as in

"Jack is the boy with whom Jenny fell in love."

while

*"Jack is the boy with who Jenny fell in love"

is ungrammatical. In the case of the construction with a stranded preposition, however, the subjective form (e.g. "who") is commonly used, as in

"Jack is the boy who Jenny fell in love with."

especially in informal style. Use of the objective case with a stranded preposition, as in

"Jack is the boy whom Jenny fell in love with."

is somewhat rare, but occasionally found, even in informal style.

=== Summary ===
Variations may be encountered in the spoken and informal English, but the most common distribution of the forms of pronouns in relative clauses follows:

	Restrictive		Nonrestrictive	
	Human	Nonhuman	Human	Nonhuman
Subject	who, that	which, that	who	which
Object of verb	who, whom, that, ∅	which, that, ∅	who, whom	which
Attached object of preposition	whom	which	whom	which
Detached object of preposition	who, whom, that, ∅	which, that, ∅	who, whom	which
Possessive	whose, of whom	whose, of which	whose, of whom	whose, of which

== That as relativizer instead of relative pronoun ==
The word that, when used in the way described above, has been classified as a relative pronoun; however, according to some linguists it ought to be analyzed instead as a subordinating conjunction or relativizer. This is consistent with that used as a conjunction in (I said that I was tired), or implied in (I said I was tired).

According to Rodney Huddleston and Geoffrey Pullum, that is not a relative pronoun but a subordinator, and its analysis requires a relativized symbol R as in (The film that I needed [R] is not obtainable). Here R is the covert direct object of the verb "needed" and has "the film" as an antecedent. A similar analysis is required when that is omitted and implied, as in (The film I needed is not obtainable).

There are some grammatical differences between that and the (other) relative pronouns: that is limited to restrictive relative clauses, and it cannot be preceded with a preposition. There are also similarities between the (purported) relative pronoun that and the ordinary conjunction that: the weak pronunciation /ðət/ is (almost invariably) used in both cases, and both of them are frequently omitted as implied.

== Fused relative constructions ==
English allows what is called a free, fused or nominal relative construction. This kind of relative construction consists of a relative clause that instead of attaching to an external antecedent—and modifying it as an external noun phrase—is "fused" with it; and thus a nominal function is "fused" into the resultant 'construction'. For example:

What he did was clearly impossible.

Here "What he did" has the same sense as "the things that he did", or "the thing that he did". Thus the noun phrase the thing and the relative pronoun that are 'fused' into what; and the resulting relative construction "What he did" functions as the subject of the verb was. Free relative constructions are inherently restrictive.

English has a number of "fusible" relative pronouns that initiate relative constructions, including what, whatever and whoever. But these pronouns introduce other clauses as well; what can introduce interrogative content clauses ("I do not know what he did") and both whatever and whoever can introduce adverbials ("Whatever he did, he does not deserve this"). See -ever.

== Nonfinite relative clauses ==
Some non-finite clauses, including infinitive and participial clauses, may also function as relative clauses. These include:

- infinitive clauses containing an 'explicit' relative pronoun (argument)—generally, but not always, fronted with a preposition—that takes an antecedent to that 'explicit' argument: She is a woman whom to beat; He is the man on whom to rely. (The infinitive verbs are 'to beat' and 'to rely'; the antecedents are 'woman' and 'man', respectively.)
- infinitive clauses presenting an 'implied' (and unvoiced) relative pronoun, or zero object argument, that takes an antecedent to that 'implied' argument: She is a woman to beat ∅; He is the man to rely on ∅.
- infinitive clauses modifying the subject of the infinitive verb: She is the person to save the company.
- present participle clauses having an unvoiced zero subject argument that takes an antecedent to the argument: The man ∅ sitting on the bank was fishing. (These clauses are the least likely to be recognized as relative clauses.)
- past participle clauses having an unvoiced zero object argument that takes an antecedent to the argument: The body found ∅ here yesterday has now been identified. (This is the "reduced object passive relative clause"; see Reduced relative clause § Non-finite types.

For further examples see Uses of English verb forms § Uses of nonfinite verbs.

== Adverbials ==
Some adverbial clauses can function as relative clauses, including:

- clauses modifying a noun, with the adverb explicit or implied (and normally replaceable by a relative clause): Here's the place I live, that is, Here's the place [where] I live ("Here's the place in which I live"). Or: This is the reason we did it, that is, This is the reason [why] we did it ("This is the reason for which we did it").
- clauses functioning analogously to free relative clauses, but in an adverbial role: I won't hide where you hide. Or: I'll do it how you do it, or I'll do it however you do it. Additionally, in a structure more related to the normal free relative clause, examples such as I see how you do it. Or: I saw where he went.

== Gapless relative clauses ==
Relative clauses in English usually have gapping. For example, in the sentence "This is the man that I saw", there is a gap after the word saw. The shared noun phrase the man is understood to fill that gap ("I saw [the man]"). However, gapless relative clauses occur in non-standard English. One form of gapless relatives uses a resumptive pronoun. In a 1990 article, Ellen Prince observed that such constructions were common in spoken English but are officially ungrammatical. For example:

They were just towed across the Midway onto the bridle path, where they were just sitting there peacefully

In this case, removing the underlined resumptive pronoun results in an acceptable gapped relative clause:

They were just towed across the Midway onto the bridle path, where they were just sitting ___ peacefully

In other cases, the resumptive pronoun is used to work around a syntactic constraint:

They have a billion dollars of inventory that they don't know where it is.

In this example, the word it occurs as part of a wh-island. Attempting to extract it gives an unacceptable result:

*They have a billion dollars of inventory that they don't know where ___ is.

Gapless relative clauses may also occur without a resumptive pronoun:

a book that you wish the author was a terrific friend of yours

== See also ==
- English grammar
- whiz deletion
