= Restrictiveness =

Type of modifier in semantics

In semantics, a modifier is said to be restrictive (or defining) if it restricts the reference its head. For example, in the expression "the red car is fancier than the blue one", red and blue are restrictive terms because they restrict, i.e., they identify, which of different objects that car and one are referring to. (Without them, the rump expression "The car is fancier than the one" would make little sense.)

By contrast, in the phrase "John's beautiful mother", the modifier beautiful is non-restrictive: "John's mother" identifies her sufficiently, where "beautiful" serves only to add more information.

Restrictive modifiers are also called defining, identifying, essential, or necessary; and non-restictive modifiers are also called non-defining, non-identifying, descriptive, or unnecessary, though using the last term can be misleading. In certain cases, as typically when restrictiveness is marked syntactically, i.e., by omittting (demarcation) commas, restrictive modifiers are called integrated; and non-restrictive modifiers are called non-integrated or supplementary.

== Restrictiveness in English ==
English does not generally mark modifiers for restrictiveness, with the exception of relative clauses: non-restrictive ones are set off in speech through intonation (with a pause beforehand and an uninterrupted melody) and in writing by using commas, whereas restrictive clauses are not. Furthermore, although restrictive clauses can be headed by any of the relative pronouns who(m), which, that or by a zero, non-restrictive clauses can only be headed by who(m) or which. For example:

- Restrictive: We saw two puppies this morning: one that was born yesterday and one that was born last week. The one that (or which (Note: In formal American English, the use of which as a restrictive pronoun is often considered to be incorrect. See That or which.)) was born yesterday is tiny.
- Non-restrictive: We saw a puppy and a kitty this morning. The puppy, which was born yesterday, was tiny.

Although English does not consistently mark ordinary adjectives for restrictiveness, they can be marked periphrastically by moving them into relative clauses. For example, "John's beautiful wife" can be rewritten as "John's wife, who is beautiful", to avoid any suggestion of ambiguity between the possibility that John has several wives and the possibility that John has but one wife.

A sentence unmarked for restrictiveness, like "The red car is fancier than the blue one," can—if necessary—be rephrased to make it explicitly restrictive or non-restrictive:

- Restrictive: The car that's red is fancier than the one that's blue.
- Non-restrictive: The car, which is red, is fancier than the other, which is blue.

English speakers do not generally find such locutions necessary, however.

== See also ==
- Apposition
- English relative clauses
- Relative clause
- Relative pronoun

== Notes and references ==
=== Sources ===
- On the intonation question, see Beverly Colins and Inger M. Mees (2003), Practical Phonetics and Phonology, London: Routledge, ISBN 978-0415506496.
