= We =

First-person plural personal pronoun in English

In Modern English, we is a plural, first-person pronoun.

== Morphology ==
In Standard Modern English, we has six distinct shapes for five word forms:

- we: the nominative (subjective) form
- us: the accusative (objective; also called the oblique) form
  - contracted 's, as in let's
- our: the dependent genitive (possessive) form
- ours: the independent genitive (possessive) form
- ourselves: the reflexive form

There is also a distinct determiner we as in we humans aren't perfect, which some people consider to be just an extended use of the pronoun.

== History ==
We has been part of English since Old English, having come from Proto-Germanic *wejes, from PIE *we-. Similarly, us was used in Old English as the accusative and dative plural of we, from PIE *nes-. The following table shows the old English first-person plural and dual pronouns:

Old English, first-person dual and plural
	Plural	Dual
Nominative	wē	wit
Accusative	ūs	unc
Dative	ūs	unc
Genitive	ūre	uncer

By late Middle English, the dual form was lost, and the dative and accusative had merged. The ours genitive can be seen as early as the 12th century. Ourselves replaced original construction we selfe, us selfum in the 15th century, so that, by the century's end, the Middle English forms of we had solidified into those we use today.

== Gender ==
We is not generally seen as participating in the system of gender. In Old English, it did not. Only third-person pronouns had distinct masculine, feminine, and neuter gender forms. But by the 17th century, that old gender system, which also marked gender on common nouns and adjectives, had disappeared, leaving only pronoun marking. At the same time, a new relative pronoun system was developing that eventually split between personal relative who and impersonal relative which. This is seen as a new personal / non-personal (or impersonal) gender system. As a result, some scholars consider we to belong to the personal gender, along with who.

== Syntax ==
=== Functions ===
We can appear as a subject, object, determiner or predicative complement. The reflexive form also appears as an adjunct.

- Subject: We're there; us being there; our being there; we planned for ourselves to be there.
- Object: They saw us; She pointed them to us; We thought about ourselves.
- Predicative complement: They have become us; We eventually felt we had become ourselves.
- Dependent determiner: We reached our goals; We humans aren't perfect; Give it to us students.
- Independent determiner: This is ours.
- Adjunct: We did it ourselves.

The contracted object form 's is only possible after the special let of let's do that.

=== Dependents ===
Pronouns rarely take dependents, but it is possible for we to have many of the same kind of dependents as other noun phrases.

- Relative clause modifier: we who arrived late
- Determiner: Not a lot of people know the real us.
- Adjective phrase modifier: Not a lot of people know the real us.
- Adverb phrase external modifier: not even us

== Semantics ==
We's referents generally must include the speaker, along with other persons, with a few exceptional cases. We is always definite and specific.

=== Royal we ===
The royal we, or majestic plural (pluralis majestatis), is sometimes used by a person of high office, such as a monarch, earl, or pope. It has singular semantics.

=== Editorial we ===
The editorial we is a similar phenomenon, in which an editorial columnist in a newspaper or a similar commentator in another medium refers to themselves as we when giving their opinion. Here, the writer casts themselves as spokesperson: either for the media institution who employs them or on behalf of the party or body of citizens who agree with the commentary. The reference is not explicit but is generally consistent with a first-person plural.

=== Author's we ===
The author's we, pluralis auctoris or pluralis modestiae, is a practice referring to a generic third person as we (instead of one or the informal you):

- By adding four and five, we obtain nine.
- We are led also to a definition of "time" in physics. — Albert Einstein

We in this sense often refers to "the reader and the author" because the author often assumes that the reader knows and agrees with certain principles or previous theorems for the sake of brevity (or, if not, the reader is prompted to look them up). This practice is discouraged by some academic style guides because it does not distinguish between sole authorship and co-authorship. Again, the reference is not explicit, but is generally consistent with first-person plural.

=== Inclusive and exclusive we ===
Some languages distinguish between inclusive we, which includes both the speaker and the addressee(s), and exclusive we, which excludes the addressee(s). English does not make this distinction grammatically, though we can have both inclusive and exclusive semantics.

Imperative let's or let us allows imperatives to be inclusive. Compare:

- Take this outside. (exclusive, 2nd person)
- Let's take this outside. (inclusive, 1st person)

=== Second-person we ===
We is used sometimes in place of you to address a second party: A doctor may ask a patient: "And how are we feeling today?". A waiter may ask a client: "What are we in the mood for?"
