= That =

Word used in English language for several purposes

That is an English language word used for several grammatical purposes. These include use as an adjective, conjunction, pronoun, adverb and intensifier; it has distance from the speaker, as opposed to words like this.

The word did not originally exist in Old English, and its concept was represented by þe. Once it came into being, it was spelt as þæt (among others, such as þet), taking the role of the modern that. It also took on the role of the modern word what, though this has since changed, and that has recently replaced some usage of the modern which.

Pronunciation of the word varies according to its role within a sentence, with a strong form, /ðæt/ and a weak form, /ðət/.

== Modern usage ==
The word that serves several grammatical purposes. Owing to its wide versatility in usage, the writer Joseph Addison named it "that jacksprat" in 1771, and gave this example of a grammatically correct sentence: "That that I say is this: that that that that gentleman has advanced, is not that, that he should have proved." That can be used as a demonstrative pronoun, demonstrative adjective, conjunction, relative word, and an intensifier.

- That as a demonstrative pronoun refers to a specific object being discussed, such as in "that is a cat"; the word is a distal demonstrative pronoun, as opposed to proximal, because there is distance between the speaker and the object being discussed (as opposed to words such as this, where there is a relative sense of closeness).
- When used as a demonstrative adjective, that describes which specific object is being discussed; for example, in the phrase "that spotted dog is Fido", that specifies which particular dog is Fido among all spotted dogs.
- In its usage as a conjunction, it connects clauses together, such as in "I know that Peter is right". In sentences with several clauses, that is also used as a discriminator to differentiate between subjects of a clause.
- As a relative pronoun, that introduces restrictive clauses, such as in "the different factors that are fundamental and specific to particular features"; in a study of medical science journals in Britain leading up to 2004, it was found that that had been largely replaced by the word which when used in this context, while writing that is increasingly formal—ranging from verse to fiction to nonfiction—finds that usage decreasing as wh- words (interrogatives) relatively increase. Some linguists instead classify this use of that as a relativizer.
- That is used as a relative adverb, such as in "it doesn't cost that much". When used in this way, that requires inferences be drawn by the listener to determine the meaning of the speaker.
- The word also intensifies elements of a sentence, similar in function to the word so, such as when one says "I was that ill ... I couldn't even stand up." But just as in its use as a relative adverb, that as an intensifier is best understood when the addressee infers meaning from its usage. In the example given, that intensifies and refers to a possible view already held by the addressee (whether the speaker was not seriously ill), even though the speaker does not explicitly confirm or intensify this previously held belief.

== Historical usage ==
"... by the grace that god put ..." (Extract from the The Book of Margery Kempe)

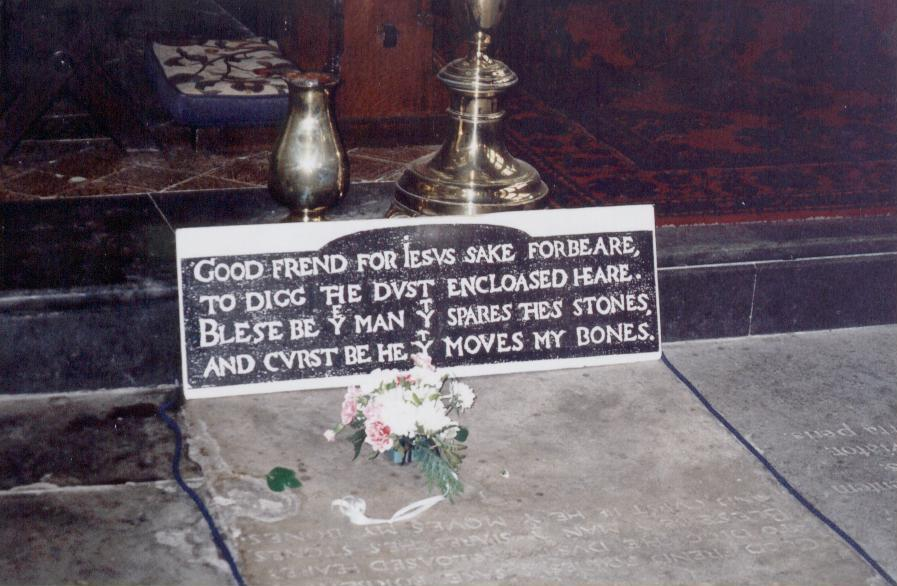
Grave of Shakespeare

In Old English, that did not exist, and was only represented by þe (the). (Note: The digraph ⟨th⟩ was written using the letter thorn, ⟨þ⟩.) It originated in the north of England sometime before the 1200s and spread around the country in the thirteenth century; it then rapidly became the dominant demonstrative pronoun. Before the writings of Ælfric of Eynsham, þæt was normally regularized as þe in writing, but by the time Ælfric lived, þæt was common. As a pronoun, þæt was widely used in Old English, though it was later replaced by wh- words. Where þe had only stood in for subjects of a clause, þæt instead took on the role of both a subject and an object, and when þe and þæt were both used, þæt was always relative in orientation.

The symbol ⟨ꝥ⟩ (Thorn with stroke or 'barred thorn') was used as an abbreviation, before it was phased out by the Romantic þͭ. (Note: A letter thorn 'crowned' with a letter t, U+00FE þ LATIN SMALL LETTER THORN + U+036D ◌ͭ COMBINING LATIN SMALL LETTER T) During the latter Middle English and Early Modern English periods, thorn, in its common script or cursive, form, came to resemble a y shape. With the arrival of movable type printing, the substitution of ⟨y⟩ for ⟨Þ⟩ became ubiquitous, leading to the common ye, as in 'Ye Olde Curiositie Shoppe'. (Note: One major reason for this was that ⟨y⟩ existed in the printer's types that William Caxton and his contemporaries imported from Belgium and the Netherlands, while ⟨Þ⟩ did not.) Thus ⟨yͭ⟩ replaced ⟨þͭ⟩ as the scribal abbreviation to represent that, as seen in the gravestone of William Shakespeare: "Bleste be yͤ man yͭ spares thes stones". In Middle English, þe was entirely replaced by þat (among other representations), before again being replaced by the modern that. Among all relative markers in the English language, including who, which, whose, and what, that—through its ancient form of þæt—appears to be the oldest. In Old English translations of Latin (but only sparsely in original Old English texts), the phrase þæt an is frequently used—typically meaning "only"—but its origins and characteristics are not well-understood. Frequently, the construction of þæt an was in the original Latin, which referred then to a following clause. The use of þæt an was for cases in which there was exclusivity (to distinguish between general and specific objects), but translators also used it in situations where exclusivity was already given through other syntactical elements of the sentence. In these texts, þæt seems to be used pleonastically (redundantly), and it began to be used as an independent adverb. In the context of weather events, þæt was never used, such as in the example sentence þæt rigneð (translated as "that rains").

Similarly, for several centuries in Old English and early Middle English texts, the phrase onmang þæt (translated as "among that") persisted. In the hundreds of years of its existence, it was used infrequently, though the usage was stable. Even in Old English, usage of hwile ("while") was much more commonplace, with its frequency some six times as large as onmang þæt in a surveyed corpus. Onmang þæt experienced grammaticalisation (turning a word into a grammatical marker), and as a result of its low usage, possibly underwent a period of specialization, where it competed with other grammaticalised phrases.

After verbs such as said, and more generally in introducing a dependent clause, contemporary English grammar allows the speaker to either include that or to omit it. This construction—as in "I suspect (that) he is right"—is called the zero form when that is not used. While there has been some analysis of the relative frequency of Old and Middle English usage of the zero form, these studies are of limited value, since they rely on unique text corpora, failing to give a general view of its usage. In the late period of Middle English, the linguist Norihiko Otsu determined, the zero form was generally as popular as the form in which that is included. The zero form was common in documents closely relating to speech, such as sermons, suggesting spoken English often omitted that in these contexts.

== Pronunciation ==
That is pronounced either as /ðæt/ (strong form) or /ðət/ (weak form) according to its grammatical role, with one as a demonstrative and the other as an anaphoric (referencing adverb). In this way, the strong form represents a determining pronoun (such as in "what is that?"), while the weak form is a subordinating word (as in "I think that it's a mistake").

The pronunciation of the voiced dental fricative /ð/ may vary, such as being stopped in Cameroonian English, resulting in a pronunciation of [dat].

== See also ==
- Eth, a letter known as ðæt (that) in Old English
- Dependent statement
- Deixis
