= It (pronoun) =

Singular, neuter, third-person pronoun in English

In Modern English, it is a singular, neuter, third-person pronoun.

== Morphology ==
In Modern English, it has only three shapes representing five word forms:

- it: the nominative (subjective) and accusative (objective) forms. (The accusative case is also called the "oblique".)
- its: the dependent and independent genitive (possessive) forms
- itself: the reflexive and intensive form

Historically, though, the morphology is more complex.

== History ==
=== Old English ===
Old English had a single third-person pronoun – from the Proto-Germanic demonstrative base *khi-, from PIE *ko- "this" – which had a plural and three genders in the singular. The modern pronoun it developed out of the neuter, singular. The older pronoun had the following forms:

Old English, third-person pronoun
	Singular			Plural
	Masculine	Neuter	Feminine	Plural
Nominative	hē	hit	hēo	hī(e)
Accusative	hine	hit	hīe	hī(e)
Dative	him	him	hire	him / heom
Genitive	his	his	hire	hira / heora

This neuter pronoun, like the masculine and feminine ones, was used for both people and objects (inanimate or abstract). Common nouns in Anglo-Saxon had grammatical genders, which were not necessarily the same as the gender of the persons referred to (though they tended to accord with the endings of the words). For instance, Old-English cild (the ancestor of "child", pronounced "chilled") is neuter, as are both wæpnedcild and wifcild, literally "male-child" and "female-child" (grammatical gender survives here; some 21st-century English speakers still use "it" with "child", see below).

The word wif, (which meant "female", ancestor of "wife" as in "fishwife"), is also neuter. Mann ("Man") was grammatically male, but meant "a person", and could, like cild, be qualified with a gender. Wifmann (variant wimman, ancestor of "woman") meant "female person" and was grammatically masculine, like its last element, mann, and like wæpnedmann (variant wepman, "male person"). Archbishop Ælfric's Latin vocabulary gives three Anglo-Saxon words for an intersex person, scritta (dialectical "skratt", grammatically masculine), wæpnedwifestre (grammatically feminine, like its last element, -estre), and bæddel (grammatically masculine).

Similarly, because waru is feminine, so are landwaru (inhabitants of a region), heofonwaru (inhabitants of heaven), and helwaru (inhabitants of hell). Angelcynn is neuter, Angelðeod feminine, and both mean "the Angles, the English people". Nouns for inanimate objects and abstract concepts also had (grammatical) genders. Mark Twain parodied this grammatical structure (which exists in many languages like German) by rendering it literally into modern English:

It is a bleak Day. Hear the Rain, how he pours, and the Hail, how he rattles; and see the Snow, how he drifts along, and oh the Mud, how deep he is! Ah the poor Fishwife, it is stuck fast in the Mire; it has dropped its Basket of Fishes; and its Hands have been cut by the Scales as it seized some of the falling Creatures; and one Scale has even got into its Eye. And it cannot get her out. It opens its Mouth to cry for Help; but if any Sound comes out of him, alas he is drowned by the raging of the Storm.

— Mark Twain, "Tale of the Fishwife and its Sad Fate", The Awful German Language (1880)

About half of the world's languages have gender, and there is a continuum between those with more grammatical gender (based on word form, or quite arbitrary), and those with more natural gender (based on word meaning). The concept of natural gender was beginning to develop in Old English, occasionally conflicting with the established grammatical gender. This development was, however, mostly to take place later, in Middle English.

=== Middle English (1066–1400s) ===
In the 12th century, it started to separate and appear without an h. Around the same time, one case was lost, and distinct pronouns started to develop, so that by the 15th century (late Middle English), the forms of it were as follows:

- Nominative: (h)it
- Accusative: (h)it / him
- Genitive: his
- Reflexive: (h)it self. Also -selfe, -selve(n), -silf, -sijlfe, sometimes without a space.

During the Middle English period, grammatical gender was gradually replaced with natural gender in English.

=== Modern English (a bit before 1550–present) ===
Middle English gradually gave way to Modern English in the early 16th century. The hit form continued well into the 16th century but had disappeared before the 17th in formal written English. Genitive its appeared in the later 16th century and had taken over by the middle of the 17th, by which time it had its modern form. "Hit" remains in some dialects in stressed positions only; some dialects also use "it", not "its", as a possessive.

== Gender ==
It is considered to be neuter or impersonal/non-personal in gender. In Old English, (h)it was the neuter nominative and accusative form of hē. But by the 17th century, the old gender system, which marked gender on common nouns and adjectives, as well as pronouns, had disappeared, leaving only pronoun marking. At the same time, a new relative pronoun system was developing that eventually split between personal relative who and impersonal relative which. As a result, some scholars consider it to belong to the impersonal gender, along with relative which and interrogative what.

== Syntax ==
=== Functions ===
It can appear as a subject, object, determiner or a predicative complement. The reflexive form also appears as an adjunct. It very seldom appears as a modifier.

- Subject: It's there; it being there; its being there; it allows for itself to be there.
- Object: I saw it; I pointed her to it; It connects to itself.
- Predicative complement: In our attempt to fight evil, we have become it; It took more than ten years it, to fully become itself.
- Determiner: I touched its top.
- Adjunct: It did it itself.
- Modifier: They were the it crowd.

==== Dummy it ====
A dummy pronoun is one that appears only for syntactic reasons and has no semantic value. One use of it is as a dummy pronoun (see also there) as in it's raining or it's clear that you understand.

In Old English, a subject was not required in the way it is today. As the subject requirement developed, there was a need for something to fill it with verbs taking zero arguments. Weather verbs such as rain or thunder were of this type, and, as the following example shows, dummy it often took on this role.

Gif on sæternesdæg geðunrað, þaet tacnað demena and gerefena cwealm

If on saturn's-day thunders, that portends judges' and sheriffs' death

If it thunders on Saturday, that portends the deaths of judges and sheriffs

But these were not the only such verbs. Most of the verbs used without a subject or with the dummy it belong to one of the following semantic groups:

1. (a) Events or happenings (chance, happen, befall, etc.)
2. (b) Seeming or appearance (seem, think, become, etc.)
3. (c) Sufficiency or lack (lack, need, suffice, etc.)
4. (d) Mental processes or states (like, list, grieve, please, repent, rue, etc.)

And examples still remain, such as the expression suffice it to say.

The same use of dummy it exists in cleft constructions, such as it's obvious that you were there.

=== Dependents ===
Pronouns rarely take dependents, but it is possible for it to have many of the same kind of dependents as other noun phrases.

- Relative clause modifier: That's not the it that I meant; *That's not it that I meant.
- Determiner: That's not the it that I meant; *That's not the it.
- Adverb phrase external modifier: not even itself

== Semantics ==
It is used to denote an inanimate physical object, abstract concept, situation, action, characteristic, and almost any other concept or being, including, occasionally, humans.

You have a way with you, Bernard. I'm not sure I like it.

— Tom Stoppard, Arcadia, 1993

The baby grunted again, and Alice looked very anxiously into its face to see what was the matter with it.

— Lewis Carroll, Alice's Adventures in Wonderland (1865)

"He looks like nobody but himself," said Mrs. Owens, firmly. [...] It was then that [...] the child opened its eyes wide in wakefulness. It stared around it [...]

— Neil Gaiman, The Graveyard Book (2008), p. 25.

But he [Jesus] said to them, "It is I; do not be afraid."

— John 6:20

It is usually definite and specific, but it can also have no referent at all (See Dummy it). It can be debatable whether a particular use is a dummy it or not (for instance: "Who is it?"—"It's me!").

Samuel Taylor Coleridge proposed using it in a wider sense in all the situations where a gender-neutral pronoun might be desired:

QUÆRE—whether we may not, nay ought not, to use a neutral pronoun, relative or representative, to the word "Person," where it hath been used in the sense of homo, mensch, (Note: Homo and Mensch are Latin and German words respectively which mean 'man' in a general sex-neutral sense, as opposed to "vir" and "Mann", which mean 'man' in the specifically masculine sense.) or noun of the common gender, in order to avoid particularising man or woman, or in order to express either sex indifferently? If this be incorrect in syntax, the whole use of the word Person is lost in a number of instances, or only retained by some stiff and strange position of the words, as—"not letting the person be aware wherein offense has been given"—instead of—"wherein he or she has offended." In my [judgment] both the specific intention and general etymon of "Person" in such sentences fully authorise the use of it and which instead of he, she, him, her, who, whom.

The children's author E. Nesbit consistently wrote in this manner, often of mixed groups of children: "Everyone got its legs kicked or its feet trodden on in the scramble to get out of the carriage." This usage (but in all capital letters, as if an acronym) also occurs in District of Columbia police reports.

Some people use it as a gender-neutral pronoun.

== Pronunciation ==
According to the OED, the following pronunciations are used:

Form	IPA	Recording
it	/ɪt/	female speaker with US accent
its	/ɪts/	female speaker with US accent
itself	(UK)/ɪtˈsɛlf/ (US)/ᵻtˈsɛlf/	female speaker with US accent

== See also ==
- Generic antecedents
- English personal pronouns
- Preferred gender pronoun
- Pronoun game
