= Gender in English =

A system of grammatical gender, by means of which all noun classes required an explicitly masculine, feminine, or neuter inflection or agreement, existed in Old English, but fell out of use during the Middle English period. Thus, Modern English largely does not have grammatical gender in this sense. However, it does retain features relating to natural gender, with particular nouns and pronouns (such as woman, daughter, husband, uncle, he and she) to refer specifically to persons or animals of a particular sex, and neuter pronouns (such as it for animals and sexless objects and they, someone and you for situations with non-explicit or indeterminate gender). Also, in some cases, feminine pronouns are used by some speakers when referring to ships (and more uncommonly some airplanes and analogous machinery), churches, nation states and islands.

Usage in English has evolved with regard to an emerging preference for gender-neutral language. There is now large-scale use of they as a third-person singular pronoun instead of the traditional generic he when referring to a person of unknown gender. Certain traditional feminine forms of nouns (such as authoress and poetess) are also increasingly avoided, with the male form of such nouns (author and poet) having become gender-neutral.

== Gender in Old English ==
Old English had a system of grammatical gender similar to that of modern German, with three genders: masculine, feminine, neuter. Determiners and attributive adjectives showed gender inflection in agreement with the noun they modified. Also the nouns themselves followed different declension patterns depending on their gender. Moreover, the third-person personal pronouns, as well as interrogative and relative pronouns, were chosen according to the grammatical gender of their antecedent.

Old English grammatical gender was, as in other Germanic languages, remarkably opaque: that is, one often could not know the gender of a noun by its meaning or by the form of the word; this was especially true for nouns denoting inanimate objects. Learners would have had to simply memorize which word has which gender. Although nouns referring to human males were generally masculine and for the most part words for human females were feminine, as Charles Jones noted, "it is with those nouns which show explicit female reference that the sex specifying function of the gender classification system appears to break down, ..." Most words referencing human females were feminine, but there was a sizable number of words that were either neuter or even masculine. Here are the discrepant nouns referring specifically to human females as listed by Jones:

| Noun | Gender | Meaning | Modern cognates |
|---|---|---|---|
| æwe | neut. | "married woman" | |
| broþorwif | neut. | "brother's wife" | |
| fæmenhadesmon | masc. | (of a woman) "virgin" | |
| foligerwif | neut. | "prostitute" | |
| forþwif | neut. | "matron" | |
| freowif | neut. | "freewoman" | |
| hiredwifmon | masc. | "female member of a household" | |
| lærningmægden | neut. | "female pupil" | |
| mædencild | neut. | "female child" | |
| mægden | neut. | "young girl" | English maid, maiden; German das Mädchen |
| mægdenman | masc. | (of a woman) "virgin" | |
| mægþman | masc. | (of a woman) "virgin" | |
| mennenu | neut. | "handmaiden" | |
| næmenwif | neut. | "married woman" | |
| sigewif | neut. | "victorious woman" | |
| siþwif | neut. | "noble lady" | |
| unrihtwif | neut. | "mistress" | |
| wif | neut. | "woman" | English wife; German das Weib |
| wifcild | neut. | "female child" | |
| wiffreond | masc. | "female friend" | |
| wifhand | masc. | "heiress" | |
| wifmann | masc. | "woman" | English woman |
| wynmæg | neut. | "winsome maid" | |
| yrfenuma | neut. | "female heir" | |

Old English had multiple generic nouns for "woman" stretching across all three genders: for example, in addition to the neuter wif and the masculine wifmann listed above, there was also the feminine frowe. For the gender-neutral nouns for "child", there was the neuter bearn and the neuter cild (compare English child). And even with nouns referring to persons, one could not always determine gender by meaning or form: for example, with two words ending in -mæg, there was the female-specific neuter noun wynmæg, meaning "winsome maid" or attractive woman; as well as the gender-neutral noun meaning "paternal kindred" or member of father's side of the family, but which was grammatically feminine: fædernmæg.

In short, inanimate objects are frequently referred to by gendered pronouns, and, conversely, there exist nouns referring to people having a grammatical gender that does not match their natural gender. Nonetheless, in Old English, pronouns may follow natural gender rather than grammatical gender in some cases. For details of the declension patterns and pronoun systems, see Old English grammar.

== Decline of grammatical gender ==
While inflectional reduction seems to have been incipient in the English language itself, some theories suggest that it was accelerated by contact with Old Norse, especially in northern and midland dialects. This correlates with the geographical extent of the Viking Danelaw in the late 9th and early 10th centuries: for almost a century Norse constituted a prestige language with regard to the southern Northumbrian and east Mercian dialects of Old English.

By the 11th century, the role of grammatical gender in Old English was beginning to decline: the Middle English of the 13th century was in transition to the loss of a gender system. One element of this process was the change in the functions of the words the and that (then spelt þe and þat; see also Old English determiners): previously these had been non-neuter and neuter forms respectively of a single determiner, but in this period the came to be used generally as a definite article and that as a demonstrative: both thus ceased to manifest any gender differentiation. The loss of gender classes was part of a general decay of inflectional endings and declensional classes by the end of the 14th century.

Gender loss began in the north of England; the south-east and the south-west Midlands were the most linguistically conservative regions, and Kent retained traces of gender in the 1340s. Late 14th-century London English had almost completed the shift away from grammatical gender, and Modern English retains no morphological agreement of words with grammatical gender.

== Modern English ==
Gender is no longer an inflectional category in Modern English. Traces of the Old English gender system are found in the system of pronouns. Nonetheless, Modern English assumes a "natural" interpretation of gender affiliation, which is based on the sex, or perceived sexual characteristics, of the pronoun's referent. Exceptions to this generality are few and debatable, for example anaphoric she referring to ships, machines, and countries (see below). Another manifestation of natural gender that continues to function in English is the use of certain nouns to refer specifically to persons or animals of a particular sex: widow/widower, postman/postwoman etc.

Linguist Benjamin Whorf described grammatical gender in English as a covert grammatical category. He argued that gender as a property inherent in nouns (rather than in their referents) is not entirely absent from modern English, citing given names such as "Jane" and words like "daughter", which are normally paired with gendered pronouns even if the speaker does not know the person being referred to. Linguist Robert A. Hall Jr. argued that these are simply examples of natural gender and not grammatical gender, as daughters are always female and people named Jane are overwhelmingly likely to be female. Moreover, if a person named Jane is a man, there is nothing grammatically incorrect with saying "Jane is bringing his friends over."

=== Personal pronouns ===
The third-person singular personal pronouns are chosen according to the natural gender of their antecedent or referent. As a general rule:

- he (and its related forms him, himself, his) is used when the referent is male, or something to which male characteristics are attributed;
- she (and her, herself, hers) is used when the referent is female, or is an object personified as female – this is common with vessels such as ships and airplanes, and sometimes with countries. An example is in God Bless America: "Stand beside her, and guide her through the night with a light from above."
- it (and itself, its) is used when the referent is something inanimate or intangible, a non-animal life-form such as a plant, an animal of unknown sex, or, less often, a child when the sex is unspecified or deemed unimportant. It is also used in the interrogative for people in some phrases such as, "Who is it?".

Pronoun agreement is generally with the natural gender of the referent (the person or thing denoted) rather than simply the antecedent (a noun or noun phrase which the pronoun replaces). For example, one might say either the doctor and his patients or the doctor and her patients, depending on one's knowledge or assumptions about the sex of the doctor in question, as the phrase the doctor (the antecedent) does not itself have any specific natural gender. Also, pronouns are sometimes used without any explicit antecedent. However, as described above (the example with child and daughter), the choice of pronoun may also be affected by the particular noun used in the antecedent.

(When the antecedent is a collective noun, such as family or team, and the pronoun refers to the members of the group denoted rather than the group as a single entity, a plural pronoun may be chosen: compare the family and its origins; the family and their breakfast-time arguments. See also synesis.)

When the referent is a person of unknown or unspecified sex, several different options are possible:

- use of he or she, he/she, s/he and (s)he
- alternation or random mixture of she and he
- use of singular they
- use of it (normally only considered when the referent is a young child)
- use of generic he (traditional, but not recommended by modern grammars)

==== Animals ====
In principle, animals are triple-gender nouns, being able to take masculine, feminine and neuter pronouns. However, animals viewed as less important to humans, also known as ‘lower animals’, are generally referred to using it; higher (domestic) animals may more often be referred to using he and she, when their sex is known. If the sex of the animal is not known, the masculine pronoun is often used with a sex-neutral meaning. For example:

Person A: Ah, there's a spider

Person B: Well put him outside

Animate pronouns he and she are usually applied to animals when personification and/or individuation occurs. Personification occurs whenever human attributes are applied to the noun. For example:

A widow bird sat mourning for her love.

Specifically named animals are an example of individuation, such as Peter Rabbit or Blob the Whale. In these instances, it is more likely that animate pronouns he or she will be used to represent them.

These rules also apply to other triple-gender nouns, including ideas, inanimate objects, and words like infant and child.

==== Metaphorical gender ====
Gendered pronouns are occasionally applied to sexless objects in English, such as ships, tools, or robots. This is known as metaphorical gender (as opposed to natural or grammatical gender). This personification of objects is usually done for poetic effect or to show strong emotional attachment.

Although the use of she and he for inanimate objects is not very frequent in Standard Modern English, it is fairly widespread in some varieties of English. Gender assignment to inanimate nouns in these dialects is sometimes fairly systematic. For example, in some dialects of southwest England, masculine pronouns are used for individuated or countable matter, such as iron tools, while the neuter form is used for non-individuated matter, such as liquids, fire and other substances.

One common use of metaphorical gender is referring to named ships as she. This is the case even for ships named after men, such as HMS King George V; otherwise, the gender of inanimate objects with proper names tends to match the gender connotation of the name. The origins of this practice are not certain, and it is currently in decline and sometimes considered offensive. In modern English it is advised against by The Chicago Manual of Style, New York Times Manual of Style and Usage, and The Associated Press Stylebook. The Cambridge Dictionary considers the practice "old-fashioned". "She" is used for ships in formal documents such as Royal Navy news headlines, official US Navy documents, ADF news, and Forbes.

The Oxford English Dictionary dates written examples of calling ships she to at least 1308 (in the Middle English period), in materials translated from French, which has grammatical gender. One modern source claims that ships were treated as masculine in early English, and that this changed to feminine by the sixteenth century. In the 1640 English Grammar, author Ben Jonson unambiguously documents the neuter gender "under which are comprised all inanimate things, a ship excepted: of whom we say she sails well, though the name be Hercules, or Henry, or the Prince." Various folk theories on the origin include the tradition of naming ships after goddesses, well-known women, female family members or objects of affection (though ships may also have male and non-personal names), the tradition of having a female figurehead on the front of the ship (though men and animals are also used as figureheads), ship sponsors (generally held by women by tradition) and various justifications (many satirical) comparing the attributes of ships with women.

She is also sometimes used as an alternative to it for countries, when viewed as political entities.

==== Transgender and non-binary people ====
Chosen pronouns are an element of gender expression. Many transgender people use the standard pronouns (he, she, etc.) that match their gender identity rather than their sex assigned at birth. Referring to transgender people using natural gender pronouns according to their sex deduced at birth, known as misgendering, is harmful and can be perceived as an insult or intentional offense if done deliberately, and embarrassing or hurtful if done accidentally. Many people with a non-binary gender identity use the singular they. Others accept he and/or she, alternate between he and she, use any pronouns, or prefer gender-neutral pronouns (neopronouns) such as xe/xem or zie.

=== Other pronouns ===
Other English pronouns are not subject to male/female distinctions, although in some cases a distinction between animate and inanimate referents is made. For example, the word who (as an interrogative or relative pronoun) refers to a person or people, and rarely to animals (although the possessive form whose can be used as a relative pronoun even when the antecedent is inanimate), while which and what refer to inanimate things (and non-human animals). Since these pronouns function on a binary gender system, distinguishing only between animate and inanimate entities, this suggests that English has a second gender system which contrasts with the primary gender system. Relative and interrogative pronouns do not encode number. This is shown in the following example:

The man who lost his head vs. the men who lost their heads

Other pronouns which show a similar distinction include everyone/everybody vs. everything, no one/nobody vs. nothing, etc.

Nouns such as ship can be indicated by the feminine pronoun she but not the relative pronoun who.

=== Gender-specific words ===
Apart from pronouns, gender can be marked in personal names and certain titles. Many words in modern English refer specifically to people or animals of a particular sex.

An example of an English word that has retained gender-specific spellings is the noun-form of blond/blonde, with the former being masculine and the latter being feminine. This distinction is retained primarily in British English.

==== Words that retain their gender-related spellings ====
Certain words' spellings are indicative of their original grammatical genders, which may not correspond to their natural genders, for example abscissa, which is derived from a Latin feminine word. Certain foreign expressions used in English exhibit distinctions of grammatical gender, for example tabula rasa.

Certain gender-indicative suffixes denoting humans eliminate any practical distinction between natural gender and grammatical gender (examples: -ess as in hostess, waitress, or stewardess; and -trix as in executrix or dominatrix). Some gender-related suffixes are almost never perceived as related to grammatical gender, for example -itis, a suffix meaning inflammation, which is derived from Greek feminines.

Many words that retain their feminine endings refer to geographical regions (for example Africa) and stars (for example lucida).

=== Regional variations ===
Speakers of West Country English may use masculine (rather than neuter) pronouns with non-animate referents, as can be seen in Thomas Hardy's works.

A similar case is found in Newfoundland English. Harold Paddock observed the following in 1981:

Nouns seem to possess a well defined but covert system of grammatical gender. We may call a noun masculine, feminine or neuter depending on the pronouns which it selects in the singular. Mass or non-count nouns (such as frost, fog, water, love) are called neuter because they select the pronoun it. Count nouns divide into masculine and feminine. Female humans and most female animals, as well as all types of vehicles (land, air and sea) are feminine, in that they select the pronouns she, her. Other count nouns are masculine in that they select the pronouns he, 'en.

Examples of "masculine" nouns in Newfoundland English are hat, shovel, book, and pencil; "feminine" are boat, aeroplane; "neuter" nouns include water, fog, weather, and snow.

Inanimate count nouns in Newfoundland Vernacular English differ from those in Standard English in that they are either masculine or feminine. Specifically, if an inanimate count noun denotes a mobile entity, then it is feminine; otherwise such a noun is masculine. Such a gender assignment is similar to but slightly different from that in Wessex Vernacular English. In Wessex Vernacular English, a non-human count noun (be it animate or not) is regarded as masculine, for example the word cow is considered as masculine.

This feature is stigmatized, widely regarded as a lower class or incorrect way of speaking. Nonetheless, one may find such a gender assignment less counterintuitive as nouns such as ship and boat can be referred to by the feminine pronoun in Standard English.

Australian English and New Zealand English both use the feminine dummy pronoun regularly in casual speech, such as in "she'll be right". This regular usage is particularly rare and not found elsewhere.

== Gender neutrality in English ==
Gender neutrality in English became a growing area of interest among academics during Second Wave Feminism, when the work of structuralist linguist Ferdinand de Saussure and his theories on semiotics became better known in academic circles. By the 1960s and 1970s, post-structuralist theorists, particularly in France, brought wider attention to gender-neutrality theory, and the concept of supporting gender equality through conscious changes to language. Debates touched on such issues as changing the term "stewardess" to the gender-neutral "flight attendant", "fireman" to "firefighter", "mailman" to "mail carrier", and so on. At the root of this contentiousness may have been backlash against the English language's shift from "grammatical gender" to "natural gender" during the early modern era, coinciding with the spread of institutional prescriptive grammar rules in English schools. These theories have been challenged by some researchers, with attention given to additional possible social, ethnic, economic, and cultural influences on language and gender. The impact on mainstream language has been limited, but these theories have led to lasting changes in practice.

Features of gender-neutral language in English may include:

- Avoidance of gender-specific job titles, or caution in their use;
- Avoidance of the use of man and mankind to refer to humans in general;
- Avoidance of the use of he, him and his when referring to a person of unspecified sex (see under § Personal pronouns above).

Certain naming practices (such as the use of Mrs and Miss to distinguish married and unmarried women, respectively) may also be discouraged on similar grounds. For more details and examples, see Gender neutrality in English.

== See also ==
- English grammar
- Gender symbol
- Gender-neutral language
- History of English
- Gender neutrality in English
