= The =

Definite article in English

The is a grammatical article in English, denoting nouns that are already or about to be mentioned, under discussion, implied or otherwise presumed familiar to listeners, readers, or speakers. It is the only definite article in English. The is the most frequently used word in the English language; studies and analyses of texts have found it to account for seven percent of all printed English-language words. It is derived from gendered articles in Old English which combined in Middle English and now has a single form used with nouns of any gender. (Note: masculine, feminine, or neuter) The word can be used with both singular and plural nouns, and with a noun that starts with any letter or sound. This is different from many other languages, which have different forms of the definite article for different genders or numbers. (Note: such as French, which uses le for masculine singular, la for feminine singular, and les for plural. Before a vowel or mute h, le and la become l' as in l'hôpital. Further information: French articles and determiners § Definite article)

== Pronunciation ==
In most dialects, "the" is pronounced as /ðə/ (with the voiced dental fricative /ð/ followed by a schwa) when followed by a consonant sound, and as /ðiː/ (homophone of the archaic pronoun thee) when followed by a vowel sound or used as an emphatic form.

Modern American and New Zealand English have an increasing tendency to limit usage of /ðiː/ pronunciation and use /ðə/, even before a vowel.

Sometimes the word "the" is pronounced /ˈðiː/, with stress, to emphasise that something is unique: "he is the first", not just "one of the" first.

== Etymology ==
The and that are common developments from the same Old English system. Old English had a definite article se (in the masculine gender), sēo (feminine), and þæt (neuter). In Middle English, these had all merged into þe, the ancestor of the Modern English word the.

== Ye form ==
"... by the grace that god put ..." (extract from the The Book of Margery Kempe)

In Middle English, the digraph ⟨th⟩ was written using the letter thorn, þ. During the latter Middle English and Early Modern English periods, thorn (in its common script or cursive form), came to resemble a y shape. With the arrival of movable type printing, the substitution of ⟨y⟩ for ⟨Þ⟩ became ubiquitous, leading to the common ye, as in 'Ye Olde Curiositie Shoppe'. Historically, the article was never pronounced with a y sound even when it was so written.

The word þe (the) was frequently written as þͤ, a ⟨þ⟩ with a small ⟨e⟩ above it. (Similarly, þat (modern that) was abbreviated using a ⟨þ⟩ with a small ⟨t⟩ above it, as can be seen in the sample illustrated here.) As a result of the ⟨y⟩ for ⟨þ⟩ substitution practice, the use of a ⟨y⟩ with an ⟨e⟩ above it (yͤ,) style became common. It can still be seen in reprints of the 1611 edition of the King James Version of the Bible (in places such as Romans 15:29) or in the Mayflower Compact.

== Geographic usage ==
An area in which the use or non-use of the is sometimes problematic is with geographic names:

- Notable natural landmarks—rivers, seas, mountain ranges, deserts, island groups (archipelagos), regions, etc.—are generally used with a "the" definite article (the Rhine, the North Sea, the Alps, the Sahara, the Hebrides, the Rhineland, the Midwest, the Balkans, the Highlands).
- Continents, individual islands, administrative units, and settlements mostly do not take a "the" article (Europe, Jura, Austria (but the Republic of Austria), Scandinavia, Yorkshire (but the County of York), Madrid).
- Names beginning with a common noun followed by of may take the article, as in the Isle of Wight or the Isle of Portland (compare Christmas Island). The same applies to names of institutions: Cambridge University, but the University of Cambridge.
- Some place names include an article, such as the Bronx, The Oaks, The Rock, The Birches, The Bog, The Harrow, The Rower, The Swan, The Valley, The Farrington, The Quarter, The Colony, The Plains, The Dalles, The Forks, The Village, The Village (NJ), The Village (OK), The Villages, The Village at Castle Pines, The Woodlands, The Pas, Wells-next-the-Sea, the Vatican, the Tiergarten, The Hyde, the West End, the East End, The Hague, or the City of London (but London). Formerly e.g. Bath, Devizes or White Plains.
- Generally described singular names, the North Island (New Zealand) or the West Country (England), take an article.

Countries and territorial regions are notably mixed; most exclude "the" but there are some that adhere to secondary rules:

- Derivations from collective common nouns such as "kingdom", "republic", "union", etc.: the Central African Republic, the Dominican Republic, the United States, the United Kingdom, the Soviet Union, the United Arab Emirates, including most country full names: the Czech Republic (but Czechia), the Russian Federation (but Russia), the Principality of Monaco (but Monaco), the State of Israel (but Israel) and the Commonwealth of Australia (but Australia).
- Countries and territories in a plural noun: the Netherlands, the Falkland Islands, the Faroe Islands, the Cayman Islands, the Philippines, the Comoros, the Maldives, the Seychelles, Saint Vincent and the Grenadines, and The Bahamas.
- Singular derivations from "island" or "land" that hold administrative rights – Greenland, England, Christmas Island and Norfolk Island – do not take a "the" definite article.
- Derivations from mountain ranges, rivers, deserts, etc., are sometimes used with an article, even for singular (the Lebanon, the Sudan, the Yukon, the Congo). This usage is in decline, The Gambia remains recommended whereas use of the Argentine for Argentina is considered old-fashioned. Ukraine is occasionally referred to as the Ukraine, a usage that was common during the 20th century and during Soviet rule, but this is considered incorrect and possibly offensive in modern usage. Sudan (but the Republic of the Sudan) and South Sudan (but the Republic of South Sudan) are written nowadays without the article.

== Trademark ==
Ohio State University registered a trademark allowing the university to use "THE" on casual and athletic clothing. The university, often referred to as "The Ohio State University", had used "THE" on clothing since 2005, but took steps to register the trademark in August 2019 after the Marc Jacobs company attempted to do the same. In August 2021, Ohio State and Marc Jacobs agreed the high-end fashion retailer could use "THE" on its merchandise, which was different from what the university would sell. Still, the university took almost an additional year to convince the United States Patent and Trademark Office that the use of "the" was "more than ... ornamental".

== Abbreviations ==
The word "The" itself, capitalised, is used as an abbreviation in Commonwealth countries for the honorific title "The Right Honourable", as in e.g. "The Earl Mountbatten of Burma", short for "The Right Honourable Earl Mountbatten of Burma", or "The Prince Charles".

== Homograph ==
There is a homograph of the definite article the, the adverb the, as in "the more the better". It has a distinct origin and etymology and by chance has evolved to be identical to the definite article.
