= English relative words =

Words marking English relative clauses and fused relatives

The English relative words are words in English used to mark a clause, noun phrase or preposition phrase as relative. The central relative words in English include who, whom, whose, which, why, and while, as shown in the following examples, each of which has the relative clause in bold:

- We should celebrate the things **which we hold dear**.
- I've been studying hard, **which explains my good grades**.
- I finally met Jordan, **who had been away**.
- That's the reason **why it works**.

Most also belong to the set of English interrogative words but function differently as relative words.

The subordinator that is widely regarded as a relative word, though one with different properties from the others. (Note: Huddleston et al do not consider that to be a relative word: "In [the sentence The video that I needed is unobtainable], there is no relative word: that is a subordinator in marker function.")

== Semantics ==
Semantically speaking, relative words typically refer to some antecedent in the containing phrase or clause. For example, who within the teacher of mine who likes apples does not question the identity of a person, but rather refers to "the teacher of mine", which in turn denotes some particular person.

=== Individual words ===
- Who (with whom) primarily refers to persons, although it can also refer to other animate beings. Whose, however, may also refer to non-persons, as in a book **whose cover is missing**.
- Which is semantically the most flexible, taking a wide range of antecedents, including propositions, as in I've skipped a lot of classes, **which is why I flunked**. A clear exception is reference to persons, usually ungrammatical as in *They're the people **which I know**. (Note: This article uses asterisks to indicate ungrammatical examples.) This is not absolute, though, as shown by the example I told her Lee was a friend, **which he was**. Arguably, this use refers to the person's position or the relation, rather than to the person himself.
- Where refers primarily to locations, but locations broadly conceived, including locations in time (e.g., a time **where we have to take that a step forward**) and situations (e.g., a situation **where we'll need to rethink things**).
- When refers primarily to times and situations.
- While refers to a period of time.
- Whence (formal, and somewhat archaic) refers to a place (broadly conceived) and in such sentences as She returned to the house **whence she had come** has a "from" meaning. Yet examples such as She returned to the house **from whence she had come** are common. Whither (distinctly archaic) is similar but with a "to" meaning; the contrast with whence is not straightforward in that *to whither is ungrammatical.
- Why refers primarily to reasons.
- As a fused relative, and in some nonstandard English dialects more widely, what is general purpose (other than for persons), and how refers to method.
- More or less archaic and formal compounds of where and a preposition: (Note: The examples below were found via the Corpus of News on the Web (NOW). This list does not exhaust the possibilities. Concatenating yet other prepositions to where and looking up these compounds in the corpora show the recent use of several. However, these tend to be limited to legal use and rare even there. As an example, NOW currently (November 2023) has but a single token of relative wherefor (among numerous tokens of typo-damaged where for, irrelevant to relatives): the eligibility clause in relation to an exemption notification is given strict meaning wherefor the notification has to be interpreted in terms of its language.)
  - Whereafter means "after which" (e.g., At the account anniversary, card purchases will revert to 0.5 per cent cashback, until total card spending reaches £15,000 – **whereafter 1 per cent cashback will be earned again**).
  - Whereat means "at which" (e.g., A Director, notwithstanding his interest, may be counted in the quorum present at any meeting of the Directors **whereat he or any other Director is appointed to hold any such office or place of profit under the Company**).
  - Whereby means "by which" or "as a result of which" (e.g., This is a new process **whereby a work coach will decide what further work search conditions or employment pathways would best support a claimant into work**).
  - Wherefrom means "from which" (e.g., You could always count on her to jump up, dance, clap, cry, and uncork the mind-hydrants **wherefrom her praise gushed**).
  - Wherein means "in which" (e.g., MIT is a phenomenon **wherein an insulator becomes capable of conducting electricity when subjected to external factors like changes in the concentration or temperature of an ambient gas**).
  - Whereof means "of which" (e.g., The results **whereof tell a story of "some win some loss"**).
  - Whereon means "on which" (e.g., And yet today the dead earth is revived by sunbeams **whereon she hangs her cloak**).
  - Whereto means "to which" (e.g., The initiation of contempt proceedings [. . .] was filed [. . .] against Union of India and others, **pursuant whereto, 45 days' time was given to contemnor to publish the already approved Byelaws of Cantonment Board, Jammu**)
  - Whereupon means "upon which" or "immediately after which" (e.g., A fine home-town debut from the seamer Brydon Carse denied New Zealand any momentum despite a misleadingly run-laden first over from Finn Allen, **whereupon a brace of forceful knocks from Dawid Malan and the inevitable Harry Brook allowed Jos Buttler to sit back in the dressing-room with his feet up [. . .]**)
  - Wherewith means "with which" (e.g., The key to real social change, they wrote, was "nothing less than vesting in the citizenry the means and the effective power **wherewith to criticize, to shape and even to challenge the actions or proposed actions of officials**")

All of the words may have singular or plural antecedents. For example, the customer who was cheated/the customers who were cheated.

That differs from the other relative words in that, like other subordinators, it lacks semantic content, referring or otherwise.

== Lexical categories and syntactic functions ==
Each relative word also has a syntactic function in a phrase or clause. For example, in the person who arrived, who functions as the subject of the relative clause. Different words have different functions depending on their lexical category and form. For example, while a plain (Note: In contexts permitting inflectional distinctions among the three cases (nominative, accusative and genitive), "The plain case represents a neutralisation of the nominative–accusative opposition". Thus you, it, what, and (other than in formal contexts or deliberate speech/writing) who are in the plain case.) pronoun like who may typically function as a subject or object, its genitive form functions only as a determiner (e.g., the person [whose keys] I found).

=== Syntax ===
A relative word occurs within a relative phrase, which appears in clause-initial position. A simple relative phrase consists of a relative word by itself (where within the restaurant where we dined; who within the man who you introduced me to). A complex relative phrase also has other material; it is exemplified by to whom within the man to whom you introduced me, from under which within the rock from under which it had crawled, and whose car within the man whose car you borrowed.

=== Individual words in relative clauses ===
- Who (with its other forms whom and whose) is a pronoun. Whose is the genitive form of who; whom is an accusative form generally limited to careful or formal writing or speech – and thus still commoner with preposition fronting (the employee to whom/^{?}who it was addressed; compare the informal the employee who/^{%}whom it was addressed to, with preposition stranding) – and who is the nominative or (other than formally) the plain form. (Whom is also found as a hypercorrected nominative.) It has been claimed that whose cannot form a simple relative phrase, but The Oxford English Dictionary disagrees, citing, for example, Everything depends on the person whose this administration is.
- Which is usually a pronoun. It is a determiner in cases like We pause for three weeks, **after which time, we will restart**.
- Where, when, and while are prepositions.
- Why is an adverb.
- That (often mistakenly called a relative pronoun) is a subordinator. In most contexts, it is omissible; thus I've said all the things (**that**) **I want to say**; She's the one (**that**) **you met last week**; That's the reason (**that**) **it works**. But it is not omissible in Standard English when the relativized element is the subject of the relative clause (*The speech **~~that~~ enraged them** was racist), (Note: While the result may be non-standard, such omission is rather common, writes Ellen Prince, as cited by James McCawley.) when the subject of the relative clause does not immediately follow that (*The book **~~that~~ during the flight I'd read** was most absorbing), or for a supplementary relative (where wh-relatives are anyway far commoner).
- In some nonstandard dialects, what (a pronoun) and how (an adverb) are used for relative clauses (e.g., ^{!}That's the thing **what we've been missing**, ^{!}That's the way **how to do it**).
- Whereupon and the other where-plus-preposition compounds are themselves prepositions.

== Fused relatives ==
A fused construction is one in which a word or phrase has two functions at once. A simple type of fused construction (not a relative) is exemplified by any within I didn't notice any: Although a noun phrase (such as any food) is normally headed by a noun, and although any is normally (as in any food) a dependent, within I didn't notice any it heads a noun phrase and thus functions as a fused dependent-head.

Similarly, a fused relative is a noun phrase or preposition phrase (not a clause, but containing one) that is headed by a relative phrase (most commonly by a simple relative phrase, and thus by a relative word alone), and that lacks an antecedent. For example, the fused relative construction who you want within Believe who you want contains the relative phrase who. This has functions within both the NP that contains the relative clause and within the relative clause itself: functions that are fused.

The fused relative is also called a free relative, free relative clause, (Note: The Cambridge Grammar of the English Language provides six arguments for regarding these as phrases; perhaps because of limited space in his much smaller book, Aarts' argument for the reverse is very terse.) nominal relative clause, and independent relative clause.

=== Fused relatives with relative words without -ever ===
A fused relative may be headed by a non-compound word, such as what, by a where+preposition compound, or by a compound with -ever. The three kinds are considered in turn.

==== Individual non-compound words in fused relatives ====
- Who, as in You can believe **who you want**. But this is archaic with who as the subject in the relative clause: **Who steals my purse** steals trash was used by Shakespeare, and survives in the expression Can I help who's next? but *You can believe **who told you** is not used today.
- Whom, as in You can believe **whom you want**.
- Whose, as in You can believe **whose version you want**.
- Which, as in You can believe **which version you want**. Like who, this is not used as the subject in the relative clause: *Use **which is handy**.
- When, as in We arrived **when it opened**.
- Where, as in My phone wasn't **where I'd left it**.
- While, as in We arrived **while the band was playing**.
- Whence (rather archaic), as in He returned **whence he had come**.
- Whither (distinctly archaic), as in He goes **whither he wants**.
- Why, as in **Why I resigned** was because of the chairman's intransigence. Use in fused relatives of why seems to be limited to pseudo-clefts.
- What, as in They ate **what was offered**. Examples with what as a determiner, such as They ate **what food was offered** and They considered **what options were open to them**, imply a small quantity or number.
- How, as in You can dress **how you like**.

==== Individual where+preposition words in fused relatives ====
- Whereof is widely used, particularly with the verb speak (The mayor, 35, knows **whereof she speaks**; perhaps best known from the final proposition within Tractatus Logico-Philosophicus in its first English translation: Whereof one cannot speak, thereof one must be silent).

=== Fused relatives with -ever relative words ===
==== Individual -ever words in fused relatives ====
- Whoever, as in I cursed **whoever had taken it**.
- Whomever, as in I borrow **from whomever I can** (although this would be a less likely alternative to I borrow **from whoever I can**).
- Whoever's, whosever, as in The gang will steal **whoever's/whosever car they can**.
- Whichever, as in Buy **whichever you like**; Buy **whichever vase/vases you like**. (Note: For the latter use, the head of which whichever is a dependent must be a count noun. With a non-count noun, as in *Buy whichever furniture you like, the result would be ungrammatical, or at best require coercion of the head noun.)
- Whenever, as in We go **whenever we can**.
- Wherever, as in There were ants **wherever we looked**.
- Whatever, as in Buy **whatever you like**; Buy **whatever vase/furniture you like**.
- However, as in **However it happened**, fix it; **However unfair it seems**, fix it.

==== -Soever and -so relative words ====
As relative words, forms ending -soever and -so are old-fashioned variants of the -ever forms. There are whoso(ever), whomso(ever), whichsoever, whensoever and whatso(ever); and the archaisms whencesoever and whithersoever are still occasionally found.

== Etymology ==
Ultimately, the English interrogative words (those beginning with wh in addition to the word how), derive from the Proto-Indo-European root k^{w}o- or k^{w}i, the former of which was reflected in Proto-Germanic as χ^{w}a- or kh^{w}a-, due to Grimm's law.

These underwent further sound changes and spelling changes, notably wh-cluster reductions, resulting in the initial sound being either /w/ (in most dialects) or /h/ (how, who) and the initial spelling being either ⟨wh⟩ or ⟨h⟩ (how). This was the result of two sound changes – /hw/ > /h/ before /uː/ (how, who) and /hw/ > /w/ otherwise – and the spelling change from ⟨hw⟩ to ⟨wh⟩ in Middle English. The unusual pronunciation versus spelling of who is because the vowel was formerly /aː/, and thus it did not undergo the sound change in Old English, but in Middle English (following spelling change) the vowel changed to /uː/ and it followed the same sound change as how before it, but with the Middle English spelling unchanged.

In how (Old English hū, from Proto-Germanic χ^{w}ō), the w merged into the lave of the word, as it did in Old Frisian hū, hō (Dutch hoe "how"), but it can still be seen in Old Saxon hwō, Old High German hwuo (German wie "how"). In English, the gradual change of voiceless stops into voiceless fricatives (phase 1 of Grimm's law) during the development of Germanic languages is responsible for "wh-" of interrogatives. Although some varieties of American English and various Scottish dialects still preserve the original sound (i.e. [ʍ] rather than [w]), most have only the [w].

The words who, whom, whose, what and why, can all be considered to come from a single Old English word hwā, reflecting its masculine and feminine nominative (hwā), dative (hwām), genitive (hwæs), neuter nominative and accusative (hwæt), and instrumental (masculine and neuter singular) (hwȳ, later hwī) respectively. Other interrogative words, such as which, how, where, whence, or whither, derive either from compounds (which coming from a compound of hwā [what, who] and līc [like]), or other words from the same root (how deriving from hū).

== Phonology ==
=== Pronunciation of initial digraphs ===
The pronunciation of English relative words starting with the ⟨wh⟩ digraph involves a phonetic element historically pronounced as /hw/ and now variously realized as /w/ or /ʍ/. Speakers with the whine-wine merger generally use /w/, resulting in words like which, and why being pronounced with an initial /w/ sound, homophonous with witch, and wye. The /hw/ pronunciation is preserved in conservative speech in the Southern United States, in certain Scottish English varieties, and elsewhere. However, the merged /w/ pronunciation has been identified as having a continuous lineage in everyday spoken Southern English from Old English to the present. Three factors have been highlighted in enabling this phonetic evolution: spelling, word frequency, and possibly a shift in the sociolinguistic status of the northern pronunciation in some circles in the south during the sixteenth and seventeenth centuries.

The initial ⟨th⟩ in that represents a voiced dental fricative /ð/, phonologically distinguishing it from other relative words.

=== Vowel sounds ===
Outside of fused relatives, relative words have unstressed pronunciation. The vowel sounds in English relative words vary, with some notable features:

1. Diphthongs and monophthongs: Words like who and whose contain a monophthong /uː/, while others like why incorporate a diphthong /aɪ/.
2. Schwa and reduction: The vowels in some relative words like which can reduce to a schwa, /ə/. As a relative word, the subordinator that has only the unstressed pronunciation /ðət/.

=== Intonational phrasing ===
Supplementary relative clauses regularly form a separate prosodic unit, with a pause before the relative phrase, while integrated relatives do not.

== Relative vs interrogative and other words ==
There is significant overlap between the English relative words and the English interrogative words, but the relative words that and while are not interrogative words, the interrogative words whether and if are not relative words, and, in Standard English, what and how are mostly excluded from the relative words. Most or all of the interrogative words that are now more or less archaic are also relative words.

The denotation of whose as an interrogative word is limited to persons, but the relative whose may denote non-persons, as in a book whose cover is missing.

Fused relatives are easily confused with open interrogatives, and even a careful analysis may conclude that, if taken out of context, a particular sentence can have either of two interpretations. An example in The Cambridge Grammar of the English Language illustrating this ambiguity is What she wrote is completely unclear. If we know what she wrote and are saying that it is hard to understand, then what she wrote is a fused relative; if on the other hand we are saying that the extent of her authorship is unknown, then what she wrote is an open interrogative content clause.

The preposition while also has other, relative-irrelevant uses: While she showered, I slept (time), While the maths exam was tough, the English exam was easy (contrast), While you're free to complain, doing so won't get you anywhere (concession).

As a relative word, the subordinator that has only the unstressed pronunciation /ðət/. It is also used more generally with subordinate clauses (I know that he's lying) and is usually unstressed, but in some contexts necessarily stressed /ˈðæt/ (That he's lying is obvious). The stressed that that has the plural form those (I'll take that) is a determiner. (Note: Both Huddleston et al and Aarts use the term determinative for the word category that we call "determiner".)

The use in fused relatives of the -ever form should not be confused with its other, non-relative uses:

- Interrogative words modified by ever, as in What ever possessed you to do that? (Note: Although ever is conventionally separated by a space, "actual usage" often attaches it.)
- NPI whatever, which can be a postnominal intensifier – as can whatsoever, which in this use is not archaic (I was left with no money whatever/whatsoever).
- However as an adverb of comparison.
- "Free choice -ever", an interrogative word in an "exhaustive conditional" construction (one whose protasis encompasses all possibilities), such as Wherever he went, Bhutan thrilled him.
- ^{%}Whereabout seems only to be used as a noun, perhaps as a singular form of whereabouts (meaning "place") understood as a plural.
- Whereas has a meaning close to that of although.
- Wherefore is an (archaic) interrogative word (meaning "why").
- Some of the where+preposition relative words listed above may also appear as more or less archaic interrogative words.
