= Goold Brown =

American grammarian (1791–1857)

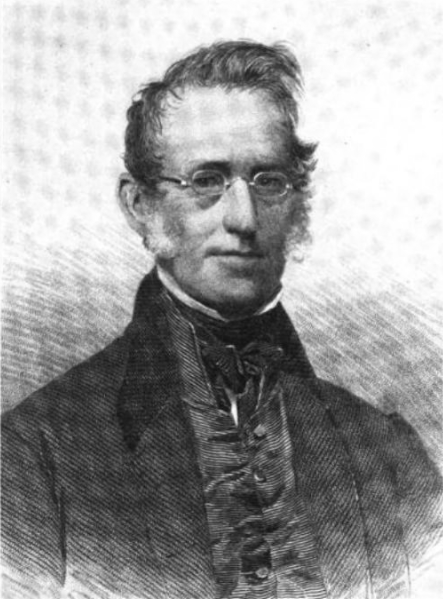
- Born: March 7, 1791; Providence, Rhode Island
- Died: March 31, 1857 (aged 66); Lynn, Massachusetts
- Spouse: Mary Starbuck
- Parent(s): Smith Brown and Lydia Gould

Goold Brown (March 7, 1791 – March 31, 1857) was an American grammarian.

== Biography ==
Goold Brown was born in Providence, Rhode Island on March 7, 1791, the third child of Smith Brown and Lydia Gould. His family could be traced to some of the earliest Quakers in New England.

He was educated in Friends' Schools in Providence and Dutchess County, New York. He began teaching at age 19, and at 21 he opened an academy for classical and literary studies in New York City.

He died in Lynn, Massachusetts on March 31, 1857.

== Bibliography ==
- Institutes of English Grammar, in 1823
- First Lines of English Grammar, in 1823
- The Grammar of English Grammars, in 1851
