= Relative pronoun =

Type of pronoun that marks a relative clause

A relative pronoun is a pronoun that marks a relative clause. An example is the word which in the sentence "This is the house which Jack built." Here the relative pronoun which introduces the relative clause. The relative clause modifies the noun house. The relative pronoun, which, plays the role of an object within that clause.

In the English language, the following are the most common relative pronouns: which, who, whose, whom, whoever, whomever, and that, though some linguists analyze that in relative clauses is a conjunction or complementizer.

== Antecedents ==
The element in the main clause that the relative pronoun in the relative clause stands for (house in the above example) is the antecedent of that pronoun. In most cases, the antecedent is a nominal (noun or noun phrase), though the pronoun can also refer to a whole proposition, as in "The train was late, which annoyed me greatly", where the antecedent of the relative pronoun which is the clause "The train was late" (the thing that annoyed me was the fact that the train was being late).

In a free relative clause, a relative pronoun has no antecedent: the relative clause itself plays the role of the co-referring element in the main clause. For example, in "I like what you did", what is a relative pronoun, but without an antecedent. The clause what you did itself plays the role of a nominal (the object of like) in the main clause. A relative pronoun used this way is sometimes called a fused relative pronoun, since the antecedent appears fused into the pronoun (what in this example can be regarded as a fusion of that which).

== Absence ==
Only about 7% of the languages around the world have relative pronouns. For example, Mandarin Chinese does not have relative pronouns at all and forms relative clauses (or their equivalents) by different methods.

Even within languages that have relative pronouns, not all relative clauses contain relative pronouns. For example, in the English sentence "The man you saw yesterday was my uncle", the relative clause you saw yesterday contains no relative pronoun. It can be said to have a gap, or zero, in the position of the object of the verb saw.

== Role ==
Other arguments can be relativised using relative pronouns:

Subject
Hunter is the boy who helped Jessica.
Object complement
Hunter is the boy whom Jessica gave a gift to.
Prepositional object
Jack built the house in which I now live. (Similarly with prepositions and prepositional phrases in general, for example, These are the walls between which Jack ran.)
Possessor
Jack is the boy whose friend built my house.

== Variant forms ==
In some languages with gender, number, and noun declensions—such as German, Serbo-Croatian, Hindi, and Latin—the relative pronoun agrees with its antecedent in gender and number, while its case indicates its relationship with the verb in the relative or main clause. In some other languages, the relative pronoun is an invariable word.

Words used as relative pronouns often originally had other functions. For example, the English which is also an interrogative word. This suggests that relative pronouns might be a fairly late development in many languages. Some languages, such as Welsh, have no relative pronouns. In some languages such as Hindi, the relative pronouns are distinct from the interrogative pronouns.

In English, different pronouns are sometimes used if the antecedent is a human being, as opposed to a non-human or an inanimate object (as in who vs. that).

(1) This is a bank. This bank accepted my identification.
(2) She is a bank teller. She helped us open an account.

With the relative pronouns, sentences (1) and (2) would read like this:

(3) This is the bank that accepted my identification.
(4) She is the bank teller who helped us open an account.

In sentences (3) and (4), the words that and who are the relative pronouns. The word that is used because the bank is a thing; the word who is used because the teller is a person. Alternatively, which is often used in defining (or restrictive) relative clauses in either case. For details see English relative clauses.

== See also ==
- Relativizer
- Relative clause
- English relative clauses
- Relative pronouns in Spanish

== Bibliography ==
- Gregory R. Guy and Robert Bayley, "On the Choice of Relative Pronouns in English", in American Speech: A Quarterly of Linguistic Usage, 70.2 (1995), pp. 148–62.
- Iliev, Ivan G. (2007). "The Origin of Bulgarian Relative Pronouns". Scripta & e-Scripta. 5: 207–227.
- Soojin Lee, "That or Which?: The that’s that of which is which, published in 2006, http://homes.chass.utoronto.ca/~cpercy/courses/6362-lee.htm
- Kordić, Snježana (1999). Der Relativsatz im Serbokroatischen [Relative Clauses in Serbo-Croatian]. Studies in Slavic Linguistics; 10 (in German). Munich: Lincom Europa. p. 330. ISBN 3-89586-573-7. OCLC 42422661. OL 2863535W. Contents. Summary.
