= He (pronoun) =

Masculine third-person, singular personal pronoun in English

In Modern English, he is a singular, masculine, third-person pronoun.

== Morphology ==
In Standard Modern English, he has four shapes representing five distinct word forms:

- he: the nominative (subjective) form
- him: the accusative (objective) form (also called the oblique case)
- his: the dependent and independent genitive (possessive) forms
- himself: the reflexive form

== History ==
Old English had a single third-person pronoun—from the Proto-Germanic demonstrative base *hi-, from PIE *ko- "this"—which had a plural and three genders in the singular. The modern pronoun it developed out of the neuter singular, starting to appear without the h in the 12th century. Her developed out of the feminine singular dative and genitive forms, while the other feminine forms and the plural were replaced with other words. The older pronoun had the following forms:

Old English, third-person pronoun
	Singular			Plural
	Masculine	Neuter	Feminine	Plural
Nominative	hē	hit	hēo	hī(e)
Accusative	hine	hit	hīe	hī(e)
Dative	him	him	hire	him / heom
Genitive	his	his	hire	hira / heora

In the 12th century, it started to separate and appear without an h. Around the same time, one case was lost, and distinct pronouns started to develop. The -self forms developed in early Middle English, with hine self becoming himself. By the 15th century, the Middle English forms of he had solidified into those we use today.

== Gender ==
He had three genders in Old English, but in Middle English, the neuter and feminine genders split off. Today, he is the only masculine pronoun in English. In the 18th century, it was suggested as a gender-neutral pronoun, and was thereafter often prescribed in manuals of style and school textbooks until the 1960s.

== Syntax ==
=== Functions ===
He can appear as a subject, object, determiner or predicative complement. The reflexive form also appears as an adjunct. He occasionally appears as a modifier in a noun phrase.

- Subject: He's there; him being there; his being there; he paid for himself to be there.
- Object: I saw him; I introduced her to him; He saw himself.
- Predicative complement: The only person there was him.
- Dependent determiner: I met his friend.
- Independent determiner: This is his.
- Adjunct: He did it himself.
- Modifier: The he goat was missing.

=== Dependents ===
Pronouns rarely take dependents, but it is possible for he to have many of the same kind of dependents as other noun phrases.

- Relative clause modifier: he who arrives late
- Determiner: A: Somebody was here, and he left this. B: I'm that he.
- Adjective phrase modifier: the real him
- Adverb phrase external modifier: Not even him

== Semantics ==
He's referents are generally limited to individual male persons, excluding the speaker and the addressee. He is always definite and usually specific.

=== Generic ===
The pronoun he can be used to refer to an unspecified person, as in If you see someone in trouble, help him. (See Gender above). However, sometimes this can seem very unnatural, as in these examples:

- ^{?}When somebody gives birth, it's good for him to have assistance.
- ^{?}If either your mother or father would like to discuss it, I'll talk to him.

The dominant epicene pronoun in modern written British English is 'they'. Many style guides now reject the generic 'he'.

=== Deities ===
When speaking of God, Jesus Christ or the Holy Spirit, some Christians use the capitalised forms "He", "His" and "Him" in writing, and in some translations of the Bible.

== See also ==
- English personal pronouns
- Gender neutrality in languages with gendered third-person pronouns
- Generic antecedent
- Third-person pronoun
