= Who (pronoun) =

English pronoun

The English pronoun who is an interrogative pronoun and a relative pronoun, used primarily to refer to persons.

Unmarked, who is the pronoun's subjective form; its inflected forms are the objective whom and the possessive whose. The set has derived indefinite forms whoever, whomever, and whoseever, as well as a further, earlier such set whosoever, whomsoever, and whosesoever (see also -ever).

== Etymology ==
The interrogative and relative pronouns who derive from the Old English singular interrogative hwā, and whose paradigm is set out below:

Paradigm of Old English hwā
	Person	Non-person
Nominative	hwā	hwæt
Genitive	hwæs	
Dative	hwǣm / hwām	
Accusative	hwone	hwæt
Instrumental		hwȳ

It was not until the end of the 17th century that who became the only pronoun that could ask about the identity of persons and what fully lost this ability.

"The first occurrences of wh-relatives date from the twelfth century (with the possible exception hwær (see Kivimaa 1966: 35)). The wh- form does not become frequent, however, until the fourteenth century." Today, relative whose can still refer to non-persons (e.g., the car whose door won't open).

The spelling 'who' does not correspond to the word's pronunciation /huː/; it is the spelling that represents the expected outcome of hwā, while the pronunciation represents a divergent outcome – for details see Pronunciation of English ⟨wh⟩. The word is cognate with Latin quis and Greek ποιός.

== Uses ==
=== As interrogative pronoun ===
Who and its derived forms can be used as interrogative pronouns, to form questions:

- "Who did that?"
- "Who did you meet this morning?" (formal: "Who(m) did you meet this morning?")
- "Who did you speak to?" (formal: "To whom did you speak?" or "Whom did you speak to?")
- "Whoever could have done that?" (emphatic form, expressing disbelief)
- "Whose bike is that?" (use of whose as possessive determiner/adjective; see possessive and English possessive)
- "Whose do you like best?" (use of whose as possessive pronoun)

The same forms (though not usually the emphatic ones) are used to make indirect questions:

- "We don't know who did that."
- "I wonder who(m) she met this morning."

The corresponding form when referring to non-humans is what (which has the emphatic form whatever, and no possessive form). Another similar interrogative is which – this can refer to either humans or non-humans, normally implying selection from a particular set, as either interrogative pronoun ("Which do you prefer?") or interrogative determiner (adjective) ("Which man should I choose?"). What can also be used as a determiner ("What book are you reading?"), but who cannot.

Which, who, and what as interrogatives can be either singular or plural ("Which is the highest hill?", "Which are the highest hills?", "Who was born in 1920?", or "Who were king and queen in 1920?"). Who and what often take a singular verb regardless of any supposed number. The question "Who wants some cake?" does not presuppose anything about number in possible responses ("I want some cake" or "All of us want some"), as does the question "What's in the bag?" ("A rabbit is in the bag" or "Five coins and a bus ticket").

=== As relative pronoun ===
The other chief use of who and its derivatives are in the formation of relative clauses:

- "These are the men who work upstairs."
- "This is Tom, who(m) I believe you have already met."
- "I helped some lads whose car had broken down."

The corresponding form for non-humans is which, although whose can be used as a possessive in relative clauses even when referring to non-humans: "I will have to fix the car whose engine I ruined."

In restrictive relative clauses, when not preceded by a preposition, both who(m) and which can be replaced by that (or by zero, if not the subject of the clause). In relative clauses, who (like other relative pronouns) takes the number (singular or plural) of its antecedent. Who also takes the person (first, second, or third) of its antecedent:

- "I, who am having a hard time right now, won't be able to help you."
- "I, a tired old man who is fed up with all your nonsense, refuse to help you."

Who and whom can also be used to form free relative clauses (those with no antecedent). The emphatic forms are often used for this purpose: "I'll take whoever you choose" (informal) or "I'll take whomever you choose" (informal). This corresponds to the use of what(ever) when referring to non-humans. (For the choice between who(ever) and whom(ever) in formal English, see § Ambiguous cases below.)

The emphatic forms can also be used to make adverbial clauses, as in "Who(m)ever you choose, I'll be satisfied". (For more details, see English relative clauses.)

=== For groups of people ===
Especially in British English and other non-American or non-Canadian varieties, who is often used as the relative pronoun of collective nouns (e.g. team, family, club) that take plural verb and pronoun forms when the emphasis is on the individual members, particularly in music and sports journalism, for example:

- "The band, who have been performing together for decades, released a new album."

== Usage of "whom" ==
=== Tendency to replace whom with who ===
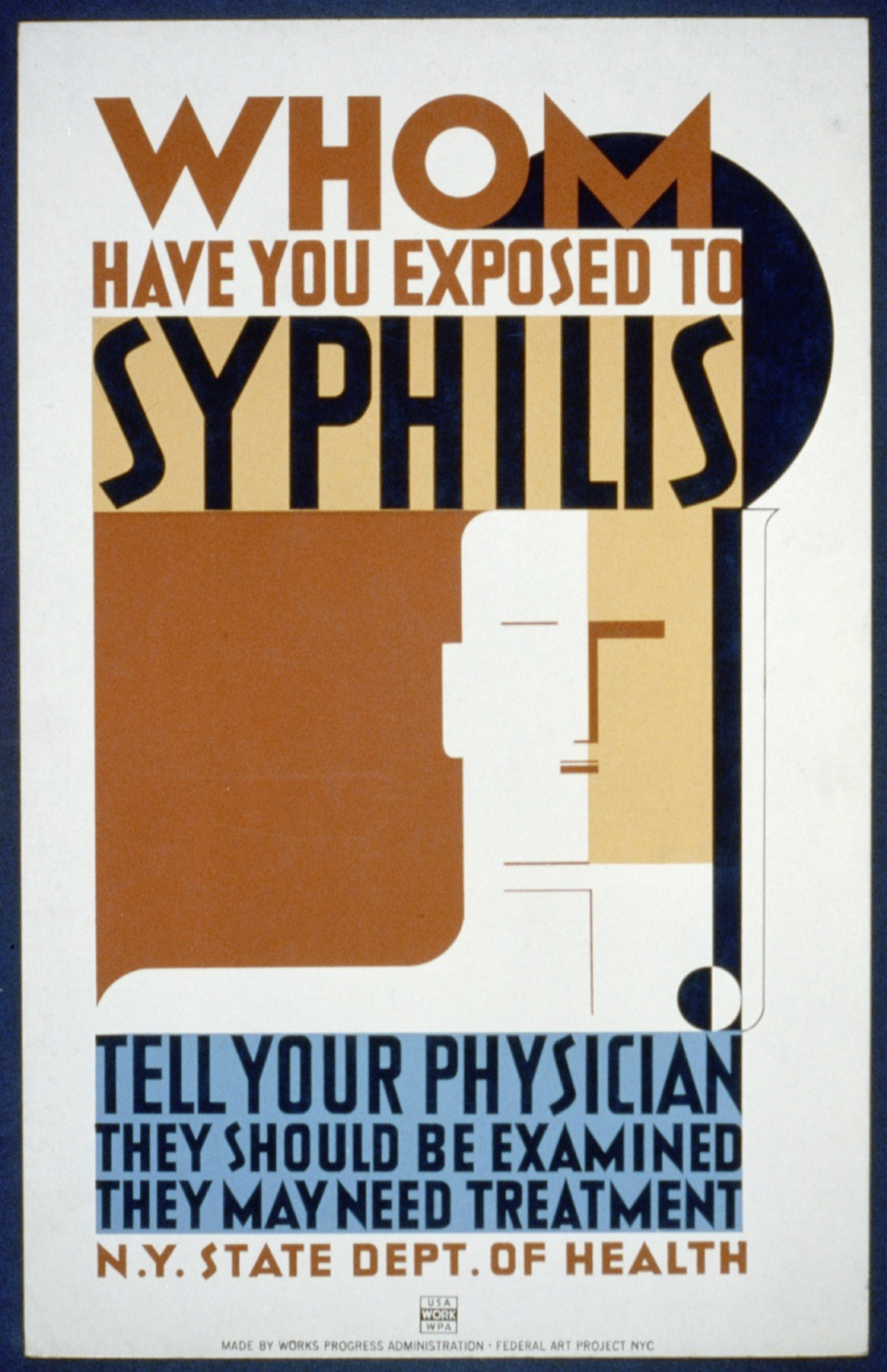
1939 poster asking "Whom have you exposed to syphilis?" Most modern English speakers would use "who".

According to traditional prescriptive grammar, who is the subjective (nominative) form only, while whom (/ˈhuːm/ HOOM) is the corresponding objective form (just as him is the objective form corresponding to he). It has long been common, particularly in informal English, for the uninflected form who to be used in both cases, thus replacing whom in the contexts where the latter was traditionally used.

In 1975, Simeon Potter noted in Changing English that nearly half a century prior, Edward Sapir predicted the demise of whom, showing at great length that it was doomed because it was "psychologically isolated" from both the objective pronouns (me, us, him, her, and them) and the invariables (which, what, that, and where, when, how, and why). By 1978, the who–whom distinction was identified as having "slipped so badly that [it is] almost totally uninformative". According to the OED (2nd edition, 1989), whom is "no longer current in natural colloquial speech". Lasnik and Sobin argue that surviving occurrences of whom are not part of ordinary English grammar, but the result of extra-grammatical rules for producing prestige forms.

According to Mair, the decline of whom has been hastened by the fact that it is one of relatively few synthetic (inflected) remnants in the principally analytical grammar of Modern English. It has also been claimed that the decline of whom is more advanced in the interrogative case than in the relative case, this possibly being related to the degree of complexity of the syntax.

Some prescriptivists continue to defend whom as the only correct form in functions other than the subject. Mair notes that whom is "moribund as an element of the core grammar of English, but is very much alive as a style marker whose correct use is acquired in the educational system [where it is taught]. [The use of whom] is highly restricted, but rather than disappear entirely, the form is likely to remain in use for some time to come because of its overt prestige in writing."

Whom is also sometimes used by way of hypercorrection, in places where it would not even be considered correct according to traditional rules, as in "Whom do you think you are?" For more examples see the § Ambiguous cases section below.

Retention of the who–whom distinction often co-occurs with another stylistic marker of formal English – avoidance of the stranded preposition. This means that whom can frequently be found following a preposition, in cases where the usual informal equivalent would use who and place the preposition later in the sentence. For example:

- "To whom did you give it?" (formal)
- "Who did you give it to?" (informal)

In relative clauses, movement of the preposition further allows whom to be replaced by that or removed entirely:

- "He is someone to whom I owe a great deal." (formal)
- "He is someone who I owe a great deal to.", "He is someone that I owe a great deal to.", or "He is someone I owe a great deal to." (informal)

=== Difference between who and whom ===
In the types of formal English in which whom is used, the general grammatical rule is that who is the subjective or nominative form (analogous to the personal pronouns I, he, she, we, and they), while whom is the objective or oblique form (analogous to me, him, her, us, and them). Thus, who is used as a verb subject, while whom is used either as an object of a verb or as the object or complement of a preposition.

Examples
Role	Clause	Original sentence, before being changed to a clause
As verb subject	Who is waiting over there?	
As verb subject	Tom is someone who works hard.	He works hard.
As verb object	Whom do you support?	
As verb object	She is someone whom many people admire.	Many people admire her.
As verb object	On whom do you plan to rely?	
As preposition complement	These are the players of whom I am most proud.	I am most proud of them.
In a relative clause	I saw the man who ate the pie.	He ate the pie.

Notice that, in the last example, the form depends on the role of the pronoun in the relative clause, not that of its antecedent in the main clause: it makes no difference that its antecedent "(the) man" is the object of "saw".

In the position of predicative expression (i.e. as the complement of forms of the copula be), the form who is considered correct, rather than whom. (Compare the case of the personal pronouns, where the subjective form is traditionally considered correct, although the objective forms are more commonly used – see English personal pronouns § Case usage.)

- "Who were those people?"
- "Who is this?"; "It is I." (formal, and traditionally correct) or "It is me." (informal, but now common usage).

In the examples below, notice how the question "Who is the captain of the team?" or the noun clause "who the captain of the team is" (we know it is a noun clause because it replaces the word "something") is the same regardless of whether the original placement of the unknown person was before or after be (is):

- "He asked something. Julia is captain of the team." or "He asked something. The captain of the team is Julia."
  - Interrogative: "He asked, 'Who is captain of the team?'"
  - Noun clause: "He asked who the captain of the team is."

==== Ambiguous cases ====
A problem sometimes arises in constructions of this kind:

- "Beethoven, who you believe was a great composer, wrote only one opera."

Such usage of who is normal; replacing it with whom would be grammatically incorrect, since the pronoun is the subject of be (in the was form), not the object of the verb "believe" (in the sense of "to have an opinion"). As an analogous example: "You believe he [not him] was a great composer.". Nevertheless, whom is quite commonly encountered, and even defended, in sentences of this type. It may arise from confusion with a form like:

- "Beethoven, whom you believe [to be] a great composer, wrote only one opera."

In this case, whom is used correctly according to the traditional rules, since it is now the object of believe (here in its "think/deem" sense). Likewise would one write "You believe him [not he] a great composer.".

The use of the "subject whom" in sentences of the first type ("Beethoven, whom you believe was...") can therefore be regarded as a hypercorrection, resulting from awareness of a perceived need to correct who to whom in sentences of the second type. Examples of this potentially confusing usage can be found throughout the history of English and of its literature. The OED traces it back to the 15th century, while Jespersen cites even earlier examples from Chaucer. More examples are given below:

- Young Ferdinand, whom they suppose is drown'd, [...] (Shakespeare, The Tempest, III, 3)
- [...] going to seek the grave / Of Arthur, whom they say is kill'd to-night / On your suggestion. (Shakespeare, King John, IV, 2)
- [...] the rest of their company rescued them, and stood over them fighting till they were come to themselves, all but him whom they thought had been dead; [...] (Defoe, The Further Adventures of Robinson Crusoe, Chapter 6, Part 1)
- But if others were involved, it was Harris and Klebold whom students said seemed the tightest, who stood apart from the rest of their clique. (From The Age newspaper, Melbourne, Australia, April 1999, in an article syndicated from the Washington Post). (Note: The original article had the correct who. Note that the continuation with the parallel construction who "stood apart" illustrates how the use of subject whom can lead to inconsistencies.)
- He saith unto them, But whom say ye that I am? (King James Bible, Matthew 16:15) (Note: Technically, whom here is not a subject, but the complement of the copula am; but in this position too it is who that would be expected according to the traditional grammatical rules, as it would be in "Who am I?")

Doubts can also arise in the case of free relative clauses, formed with who(m), who(m)ever, or who(m)soever. Modern guides to English usage say that the relative pronoun should take the case appropriate to the relative clause, not the function performed by that clause within an external clause. For example, it is correct to write "I'll talk to whoever [not whomever] will listen.", since whoever is the subject of "will listen". On the other hand, "Whomever you choose will suit me" is correct, since whomever is now the object of "choose".

Similarly:

- "Let whoever be without sin cast the first stone." (In the internal clause, whoever is the subject of be.)
- "Whom you choose will be placed on this list." (In the internal clause, whom is the object of choose.)

In sentences of this type, as with "subject whom" examples, use of whom(ever) is sometimes found in places where it would not be grammatically expected, due to the relative complexity of the syntax. In fact, in Middle English it was standard for the form of the pronoun to depend on the function in the external clause; the modern rule came about through re-analysis of the pronoun as primarily an element of the internal clause.

== Usage of whose ==
Whose is the genitive case of whom.

- "The boy whose name I don't remember came from Japan."

Unlike the other forms of who, relative whose (but not interrogative whose) can still refer to non-persons, in the way that all forms of the word could in Old and Middle English.

- "The cars whose door won't open."

== Bibliography ==
- Glenn, Loretta; Gray (2007). The Writer's Harbrace Handbook, Brief. Cengage Learning. p. 339. ISBN 978-1-4130-3060-0.
- Jespersen, Otto (1965) [1924]. The Philosophy of Grammar. New York City: Norton. appendix. ISBN 0-226-39881-1.
- Brinten, L.; Arnovick (2009). The English Language: A Linguistic History. Oxford: Oxford University Press.
- Mair, C. (2009). Twentieth-Century English: History, Variation, and Standardization. Cambridge: Cambridge University Press. ISBN 978-0-521-83219-9.
- Potter, S. (1975). Changing English. London: The Trinity Press. ISBN 0-233-96648-X.
- Arts, F. (2004). "Relative Who And Whom: Prescriptive Rules And Linguistic Reality". American Speech. 69 (1): 71–79. doi:10.2307/455950. JSTOR 455950.
- Yoko, I.; Y. Michiko (2009). "Relative and Interrogative Who/Whom in Contemporary Professional American English". Germanic Languages and Linguistic Universals: 177–191.
- Lasnik, Howard; Nicholas Sobin (2000). "The who/whom puzzle: On the preservation of an archaic feature". Natural Language and Linguistic Theory. 18 (2): 343–371. doi:10.1023/A:1006322600501. S2CID 169543996.
- Safire, William (7 October 1990). "On Language; Shnorring the Burden". The New York Times Magazine.
- Wanner, Eric; Michael Maratsos (1978). "An ATN Approach to Comprehension". In Halle, M.; Bresnan, J.; Miller, G. (eds.). Linguistic theory and psychological reality. Cambridge, MA: MIT Press. p. 133. ISBN 978-0-262-58043-4.
