= Antecedent (grammar) =

Expression that gives its meaning to a pro-form in grammar

In grammar, an antecedent is one or more words that identifies a pronoun or other pro-form. For example, in the sentence "John arrived late because traffic held him up," the word "John" is the antecedent of the pronoun "him." Pro-forms usually follow their antecedents, but sometimes precede them. In the latter case, the more accurate term would technically be postcedent, although this term is not commonly distinguished from antecedent because the definition of antecedent usually encompasses it. The linguistic term that is closely related to antecedent and pro-form is anaphora. Theories of syntax explore the distinction between antecedents and postcedents in terms of binding.

== Examples ==
Almost any syntactic category can serve as the antecedent to a pro-form. The following examples illustrate a range of proforms and their antecedents. The pro-forms are in bold, and their antecedents are underlined:

a. Willy said he likes chocolate. - Noun as antecedent

b. My eccentric uncle likes chocolate. He tells everyone to buy him chocolate. - Noun phrase as antecedent

c. Larry was helpful, and so was Kim. - Adjective as antecedent

d. He arrived in the afternoon, when nobody was home. - Prepositional phrase as antecedent

e. Thomas plays soccer in the park. The kids all congregate there. - Prepositional phrase as antecedent

f. Our helpers did it very carefully, and we did it like that as well. - Adverb phrase as antecedent

g. Fred works hard, but Tom does not do the same. - Verb phrase as antecedent

h. Susan lies all the time, which everybody knows about. - Entire clause as antecedent

i. Our politicians have been pandering again. This demotivates the voters. - Entire sentence as antecedent

j. Rob is a dentist and, as such, he fixes teeth. - Noun phrase as antecedent

k. Someone called who offered to help. She was really friendly. - Discontinuous word combination as antecedent

l. The paragraph has in fact been checked by Sam, but Susan won't do it. - Discontinuous word combination as antecedent

This list of proforms and the types of antecedents that they take is by no means exhaustive, but rather it is intended to merely deliver an impression of the breadth of expressions that can function as proforms and antecedents. While the stereotypical proform is a pronoun and the stereotypical antecedent a noun or noun phrase, these examples demonstrate that most any syntactic category can in fact serve as an antecedent to a proform, whereby the proforms themselves are a diverse bunch. The last two examples are particularly interesting, because they show that some proforms can even take discontinuous word combinations as antecedents, i.e. the antecedents are not constituents. A particularly frequent type of proform occurs in relative clauses. Many relative clauses contain a relative pronoun, and these relative pronouns have an antecedent. Sentences 'd' and 'h' above contain relative clauses; the proforms when and which are relative proforms.

== Uncertain antecedents ==
In some cases, the wording could have an uncertain antecedent, where the antecedent of a pronoun is not clear because two or more prior nouns or phrases could match the count, gender, or logic as a prior reference. In such cases, scholars have recommended to rewrite the sentence structure to be more specific, or repeat the words of the antecedent rather than use only a pronoun phrase, as a technique to resolve the uncertain antecedent.

For example, consider the sentence, "There was a doll inside the box that was made of clay", where the word "that" could refer to either the box or the doll. To make it clear that the doll is what is made of clay, the sentence could be reworded as one of the following: "Inside the box, there was a doll that was made of clay", "Inside the box, there was a doll made of clay", or "There was a girl doll inside the box, and she was made of clay" (or similar wording).

Antecedents may also be unclear when they occur far from the noun or phrase they refer to. Bryan Garner calls these "remote relatives" and gives this example from the New York Times:

"C-130 aircraft packed with radio transmitters flew lazy circles over the Persian Gulf broadcasting messages in Arabic to the Iraqi people that were monitored by reporters near the border."

— Patrick E. Tyler, “War Imminent as Hussein Rejects Ultimatum,” N.Y. Times, 19 Mar. 2003

As Garner points out, “that were…the border” modifies “messages”, which occurs 7 words (3 of which are nouns) before. In context, the phrase could also modify “the Iraqi people”, hence the uncertainty.

== Postcedents ==
The ante- in antecedent means 'before; in front of'. Thus, when a pro-form precedes its antecedent, the antecedent is not literally an antecedent, but rather it is a postcedent, post- meaning 'after; behind'. The following examples, wherein the pro-forms are bolded and their postcedents are underlined, illustrate this distinction:

a. When it is ready, I'll have a cup of coffee. - Noun as postcedent
b. In her bed, my friend spends the entire morning. - Noun phrase as postcedent
c. It bothered me that she did not call. - Clause as postcedent, example of it-extraposition
d. Two violinists were there, at the party. - Prepositional phrase as postcedent
e. Sam tries to work then, when it is raining. - Clause as postcedent

Postcedents are rare compared to antecedents, and in practice, the distinction between antecedents and postcedents is often ignored, with the term antecedent being used to denote both. This practice is a source of confusion, and some have therefore denounced using the term antecedent to mean postcedent because of this confusion.

== Implied antecedents ==
Some pro-forms lack a linguistic antecedent. In such cases, the antecedent is implied in the given discourse environment or from general knowledge of the world. For instance, the first person pronouns I, me, we, and us and the second person pronoun you are pro-forms that usually lack a linguistic antecedent. However, their antecedents are present in the discourse context as the speaker and the listener. Pleonastic pro-forms also lack a linguistic antecedent, e.g. It is raining, where the pronoun it is semantically empty and cannot be viewed as referring to anything specific in the discourse world. Definite pro-forms such as they and you also have an indefinite use, which means they denote some person or people in general, e.g. They will get you for that, and therefore cannot be construed as taking a linguistic antecedent.

== See also ==
- Binding — Association of anaphoric elements
- Generic antecedent – Representatives of classes in a situation in which gender is typically unknown
- Pro-drop language – Language in which certain pronouns may sometimes be omitted
