= Reduced relative clause =

Aspect of English grammar

A reduced relative clause is a relative clause that is not marked by an explicit relative pronoun or relativizer such as who, which or that. An example is the clause I saw in the English sentence "This is the man I saw." Unreduced forms of this relative clause would be "This is the man that I saw." or "...whom I saw."

Another form of reduced relative clause is the "reduced object passive relative clause", a type of nonfinite clause headed by a past participle, such as the clause found here in: "The animals found here can be dangerous."

Reduced relative clauses are given to ambiguity or garden path effects, and have been a common topic of psycholinguistic study, especially in the field of sentence processing.

== Finite types ==
Regular relative clauses are a class of dependent clause (or "subordinate clause") that usually modifies a noun. They are typically introduced by one of the relative pronouns who, whom, whose, what, or which—and, in English, by the word that, which may be analyzed either as a relative pronoun or as a relativizer; see That as relativizer.

Reduced relative clauses have no such relative pronoun or relativizer introducing them. The example below contrasts an English non-reduced relative clause and reduced relative clause.

Relative clause:	The Viking	who(m) I saw	was humongous.
	Subject of main clause	Relative clause	Predicate of main clause
Reduced relative clause:	The Viking	I saw	was humongous.
	Subject of main clause	Reduced relative clause	Predicate of main clause

Because of the omission of function words, the use of reduced relative clauses, particularly when nested, can give rise to sentences which, while theoretically correct grammatically, are not readily parsed by listeners. A well-known example put forward by linguists is "Buffalo buffalo Buffalo buffalo buffalo buffalo Buffalo buffalo", which contains the reduced relative clause Buffalo buffalo buffalo (meaning "which buffalo from Buffalo (do) buffalo").

== Non-finite types ==
In English, the similarity between the active past tense form of verbs (i.e., "John kicked the ball") and the passive past tense (i.e., "the ball was kicked") can give rise to confusion concerning a special form of reduced relative clause, called the reduced object relative passive clause (so called because the noun being modified is the direct object of the relative clause, and the relative clause is in passive voice), the most famous example of which is

The horse raced past the barn fell.

In sentences such as this, when the reader or hearer encounters the verb (in this case, raced) he or she can interpret it in two different ways: as a main verb, or the first verb of a reduced relative clause. Linguist David W. Carrol gives the example of "the florist sent...", which could either go on to form a sentence such as "the florist sent the flowers to the elderly widow" (in which "sent" is the main verb), or one such as "the florist [who was] sent the flowers was very pleased" (in which "sent" is the beginning of a reduced relative clause). Sentences like this often produce a garden path effect—an effect whereby a reader begins a sentence with one interpretation, and later is forced to backtrack and re-analyze the sentence's structure. The diagram below illustrates the garden path effect in the sentence "the florist sent the flowers was pleased," where (1) represents the initial structure assigned to the sentence, (2) represents the garden path effect elicited when the reader encounters "was" and has nowhere to put it, and (3) represents the re-analysis of the sentence as containing a reduced relative clause.

While reduced relative clauses are not the only structures that create garden path sentences in English (other forms of garden path sentences include those caused by lexical ambiguity, or words that can have more than one meaning), they are the "classic" example of garden path sentences, and have been the subject of the most research.

=== Criticism ===
Not all grammatical frameworks include reduced relative clauses. The term reduced relative clause comes from transformational generative grammar, which assumes deep structures and surface structures in language. Frameworks that assume no underlying form label non-finite reduced relative clauses as participial phrases.

- Students who are living on campus will receive a refund. (full relative clause)
- Students living on campus will receive a refund. (participial phrase)
- Bikes that are ridden to school must be left in the bicycle racks. (full relative clause)
- Bikes ridden to school must be left in the bicycle racks. (participial phrase)

== Use in psycholinguistic research ==
Across languages, reduced relative clauses often give rise to temporary ambiguity (garden path effects), since the first word of a reduced clause may initially be interpreted as part of the main clause. Therefore, reduced relative clauses have been the subject of "an enormous number of experiments" in psycholinguistics, especially for investigating whether semantic information or information from the context can affect how a reader or listener initially parses a sentence. For example, one study compared sentences in which the garden path effect was more likely because the reduced relative verb was one that was likely to be used as a main verb for its subject (as in "the defendant examined...[by the lawyer]", where the subject "defendant" is animate and could be the do-er of the action) and sentences in which the garden path effect was less likely (as in "the evidence examined...[by the lawyer]", where the subject "evidence" is not animate and thus could not be doing the examining). Reduced relative clauses have also been used in studies of second-language acquisition, to compare how native speakers handled reduced relatives and how non-native speakers handle them.

In languages with head-final relative clauses, such as Chinese, Japanese, and Turkish, non-reduced relative clauses may also cause temporary ambiguity because the relativizer does not precede the relative clause (and thus a person reading or hearing the relative clause has no "warning" that they are in a relative clause).

== See also ==
- Dummy pronoun

== Bibliography ==
- Carrol, David W (2008). Psychology of Language (5 ed.). Belmont: Thomson & Wadsworth.
- Li, Charles N; Sandra A Thompson (1981). Mandarin Chinese: A Functional Reference Grammar. Los Angeles: University of California Press.
- Townsend, David J; Thomas G Bever (2001). Sentence Comprehension: The Integration of Habits and Rules. Cambridge: MIT Press.
