= Relative clause =

Grammatical structure

A relative clause is a clause that modifies a noun or noun phrase and uses some grammatical device to indicate that one of the arguments in the relative clause refers to the noun or noun phrase. For example, in the sentence I met a man who wasn't too sure of himself, the subordinate clause who wasn't too sure of himself is a relative clause since it modifies the noun man and uses the pronoun who to indicate that the same "MAN" is referred to in the subordinate clause (in this case as its subject).

In many languages, relative clauses are introduced by a special class of pronouns called relative pronouns, such as who in the example just given. In other languages, relative clauses may be marked in different ways: they may be introduced by a special class of conjunctions called relativizers, the main verb of the relative clause may appear in a special morphological variant, or a relative clause may be indicated by word order alone. In some languages, more than one of these mechanisms may be possible.

== Types ==
=== Bound and free ===
A bound relative clause, the type most often considered, qualifies an explicit(say)) element (usually a noun or noun phrase) appearing in the main clause, and refers back to that element by means of some explicit or implicit device within the relative clause.

The relative clause may also function as an embedded clause within a main (or higher-level) clause, thereby forming a matrix sentence. The noun in the main clause that the relative clause modifies is called the head noun, or (particularly when referred back to by a relative pronoun) the antecedent.

For example, in the English sentence "The person whom I saw yesterday went home", the relative clause "whom I saw yesterday" modifies the head noun person, and the relative pronoun whom refers back to the referent of that noun. The sentence is equivalent to the following two sentences: "I saw a person yesterday. That person went home". The shared argument need not fulfill the same role in both clauses; in this example the same person is referred to by the subject of the matrix clause, but the direct object of the relative clause.

A free relative clause (or fused relative), on the other hand, does not have an explicit antecedent external to itself. Instead, the relative clause itself takes the place of an argument in the matrix clause. For example, in the English sentence "I like what I see", the clause what I see is a free relative clause, because it has no antecedent, but itself serves as the object of the verb like in the main clause. Alternatively, one could argue that the free relative clause has a zero as its antecedent.

=== Restrictive and non-restrictive ===
Bound relative clauses may or may not be restrictive. A restrictive relative clause is a relative clause that functions as a restrictive modifier. A non-restrictive relative clause is a relative clause that is not a restrictive relative clause. Whereas a non-restrictive or non-defining relative clause merely provides supplementary information, a restrictive or defining relative clause modifies the meaning of its head word (restricts its possible referent). For example:

- The person who lives in this house has not been seen for days. This contains the restrictive relative clause who lives in this house, which modifies the meaning of person and is essential to the sentence. If this clause were omitted, it would no longer be known which person is being referred to, and the remaining part would not really make sense.
- The mayor, who lives in this house, has not been seen for days. This contains a non-restrictive relative clause since this provides supplementary information about the mayor but is not essential to the sentence. If this clause were omitted, it would still be known who is meant (the mayor), and the remaining part would still make sense.

In speaking, it is natural to make slight pauses around non-restrictive clauses, and in English this is shown in writing by commas (as in the examples). However, many languages distinguish the two types of relative clauses in this way only in speaking, not in writing. Another difference in English is that only restrictive relative clauses may be introduced with that or use the "zero" relative pronoun (see English relative clauses for details).

A non-restrictive relative clause may have a whole sentence as its antecedent rather than a specific noun phrase; for example:

- The cat was allowed on the bed, which annoyed the dog.

Here, which refers not to the bed or the cat but to the entire proposition expressed in the main clause, namely the situation of the cat being allowed on the bed.

== Formation methods ==
Languages differ in many ways in how relative clauses are expressed:

1. How the role of the shared noun phrase is indicated in the embedded clause.
2. How the two clauses are joined together.
3. Where the embedded clause is placed relative to the head noun (in the process indicating which noun phrase in the main clause is modified).

For example, the English sentence "The person that I saw yesterday went home" can be described as follows:

1. The role of the shared noun in the embedded clause is indicated by gapping; that is, a gap is left in the object position after "saw", implying that the shared noun phrase ("the person") is to be understood to fill that gap and to serve as the object of the verb "saw".
2. The clauses are joined by the complementizer "that".
3. The embedded clause is placed after the head noun "the person".

The following sentences indicate various possibilities (only some of which are grammatical in English):

- "The person [that I saw yesterday] went home". (A complementizer linking the two clauses with a gapping strategy indicating the role of the shared noun in the embedded clause. One possibility in English. Very common cross-linguistically.)
- "The person [I saw yesterday] went home". (Gapping strategy, with no word joining the clauses—also known as a reduced relative clause. One possibility in English. Used in Arabic when the head noun is indefinite, as in "a person" instead of "the person".)
- "The person [whom I saw yesterday] went home". (A relative pronoun indicating the role of the shared noun in the embedded clause—in this case, the direct object. Used in formal English, as in Latin, German or Russian.)
- "The person [seen by me yesterday] went home". (A reduced relative clause, in this case passivized. One possibility in English.)
- "The person [that I saw him yesterday] went home". (A complementizer linking the two sentences with a resumptive pronoun indicating the role of the shared noun in the embedded clause, as in Arabic, Hebrew or Persian.)
- "The person [that him I saw yesterday] went home". (Similar to the previous, but with the resumptive pronoun fronted. This occurs in modern Greek and as one possibility in modern Hebrew; the combination that him of complementizer and resumptive pronoun behaves similarly to a unitary relative pronoun.)
- "The [I saw yesterday]'s person went home". (Preceding relative clause with gapping and use of a possessive particle—as normally used in a genitive construction—to link the relative clause to the head noun, as in Chinese.)
- "The [yesterday I seeing]'s person went home". (Preceding relative clause with gapping, and Nominalized the final verb, then use of a possessive particle—as normally used in a genitive construction—to link the relative clause to the head noun. This occurs in many Sino-Tibetan languages and possibly developed from "relative clause + noun" > "nominalized clause + noun" > "genitive construction"., as in Tibetan.)
- "The [I saw yesterday] person went home". (Preceding relative clause with gapping and no linking word, as in Japanese or Mongolian.)
- "The [yesterday my seeing] person went home". (Nominalized relative clause, as in Turkish.)
- "[Which person I saw yesterday], that person went home". (A correlative structure, as in Hindi.)
- "[I saw the person yesterday] went home." (An unreduced, internally headed relative clause, as in Navajo.)

=== Strategies for indicating the role of the shared noun in the relative clause ===
There are four main strategies for indicating the role of the shared noun phrase in the embedded clause. These are typically listed in order of the degree to which the noun in the relative clause has been reduced, from most to least:

1. Gap strategy or gapped relative clause
2. Relative pronoun
3. Pronoun retention
4. Nonreduction

==== Gapped relative clause ====
In this strategy, there is simply a gap in the relative clause where the shared noun would go. This is normal in English, for example, and also in Chinese and Japanese. This is the most common type of relative clause, especially in verb-final languages with prenominal relative clauses, but is also widespread among languages with postnominal externally headed relative clauses.

There may or may not be any marker used to join the relative and main clauses. (Languages with a case-marked relative pronoun are technically not considered to employ the gapping strategy even though they do in fact have a gap, since the case of the relative pronoun indicates the role of the shared noun.) Often the form of the verb is different from that in main clauses and is to some degree nominalized, as in Turkish and in English reduced relative clauses.

In non-verb-final languages, apart from languages like Thai and Vietnamese with very strong politeness distinctions in their grammars, gapped relative clauses tend, however, to be restricted to positions high up in the accessibility hierarchy. With obliques and genitives, non-verb-final languages that do not have politeness restrictions on pronoun use tend to use pronoun retention. English is unusual in that all roles in the embedded clause can be indicated by gapping: e.g. "I saw the person who is my friend", but also (in progressively less accessible positions cross-linguistically, according to the accessibility hierarchy described below) "... who I know", "... who I gave a book to", "... who I spoke with", "... who I run slower than". Usually, languages with gapping disallow it beyond a certain level in the accessibility hierarchy, and switch to a different strategy at this point. Classical Arabic, for example, only allows gapping in the subject and sometimes the direct object; beyond that, a resumptive pronoun must be used. Some languages have no allowed strategies at all past a certain point—e.g. in many Austronesian languages, such as Tagalog, all relative clauses must have the shared noun serving the subject role in the embedded clause. In these languages, relative clauses with shared nouns serving "disallowed" roles can be expressed by passivizing the embedded sentence, thereby moving the noun in the embedded sentence into the subject position. This, for example, would transform "The person who I gave a book to" into "The person who was given a book by me". Generally, languages such as this "conspire" to implement general relativization by allowing passivization from all positions — hence a sentence equivalent to "The person who is run slower than by me" is grammatical. Gapping is often used in conjunction with case-marked relative pronouns (since the relative pronoun indicates the case role in the embedded clause), but this is not necessary (e.g. Chinese and Japanese both using gapping in conjunction with an indeclinable complementizer).

==== Relative pronoun type ====
This is a type of gapped relative clause, but is distinguished by the fact that the role of the shared noun in the embedded clause is indicated indirectly by the case marking of the marker (the relative pronoun) used to join the main and embedded clauses. All languages which use relative pronouns have them in clause-initial position: though one could conceivably imagine a clause-final relative pronoun analogous to an adverbial subordinator in that position, they are unknown.

Some languages have what are described as "relative pronouns" (in that they agree with some properties of the head noun, such as number and gender) but which do not actually indicate the case role of the shared noun in the embedded clause. Classical Arabic has "relative pronouns" which are case-marked, but which agree in case with the head noun. Case-marked relative pronouns in the strict sense are almost entirely confined to European languages, where they are widespread except among the Celtic family and Indo-Aryan family. The influence of Spanish has led to their adaption by a very small number of Native American languages, of which the best known are the Keresan languages.

==== Pronoun retention type ====
In this type, the position relativized is indicated by means of a personal pronoun in the same syntactic position as would ordinarily be occupied by a noun phrase of that type in the main clause—known as a resumptive pronoun. It is equivalent to saying "The woman who I saw her yesterday went home". Pronoun retention is very frequently used for relativization of inaccessible positions on the accessibility hierarchy. In Persian and Classical Arabic, for example, resumptive pronouns are required when the embedded role is other than the subject or direct object, and optional in the case of the direct object. Resumptive pronouns are common in non-verb-final languages of Africa and Asia, and also used by the Celtic languages of northwest Europe and Romanian ("Omul pe care l-am văzut ieri a mers acasă"/"The man who I saw him yesterday went home"). They also occur in deeply embedded positions in English, as in "That's the girl that I don't know what she did", although this is sometimes considered non-standard.

Only a very small number of languages, of which the best known is Yoruba, have pronoun retention as their sole grammatical type of relative clause.

==== Nonreduction type ====
In the nonreduction type, unlike the other three, the shared noun occurs as a full-fledged noun phrase in the embedded clause, which has the form of a full independent clause. Typically, it is the head noun in the main clause that is reduced or missing. Some languages use relative clauses of this type with the normal strategy of embedding the relative clause next to the head noun. These languages are said to have internally headed relative clauses, which would be similar to the (ungrammatical) English structure "[You see the girl over there] is my friend" or "I took [you see the girl over there] out on a date". This is used, for example, in Navajo, which uses a special relative verb (as with some other Native American languages).

A second strategy is the correlative-clause strategy used by Hindi and other Indo-Aryan languages, as well as Bambara. This strategy is equivalent to saying "Which girl you see over there, she is my daughter" or "Which knife I killed my friend with, the police found that knife". It is "correlative" because of the corresponding "which ... that ..." demonstratives or "which ... she/he/it ..." pronouns, which indicate the respective nouns being equated. The shared noun can either be repeated entirely in the main clause or reduced to a pronoun. There is no need to front the shared noun in such a sentence. For example, in the second example above, Hindi would actually say something equivalent to "I killed my friend with which knife, the police found that knife".

Dialects of some European languages, such as Italian, do use the nonreduction type in forms that could be glossed in English as "The person just passed us by, she introduced me to the chancellor here."

In general, however, nonreduction is restricted to verb-final languages, though it is more common among those that are head-marking.

=== Strategies for joining the relative clause to the main clause ===
The following are some of the common strategies for joining the two clauses:

- Use of an indeclinable particle (specifically, a relativizer) inserted into the sentence, placed next to the modified noun; the embedded clause is likewise inserted into the appropriate position, typically placed on the other side of the complementizer. This strategy is very common and arguably occurs in English with the word that ("the woman that I saw"), though this interpretation of "that" as something other than a relative pronoun is controversial (see below). In the modern varieties of Arabic (using illi placed after the modified noun); in Chinese (using de placed before the modified noun).
- Use of a relative pronoun. Prototypically, a relative pronoun agrees with the head noun in gender, number, definiteness, animacy, etc., but adopts the case that the shared noun assumes in the embedded, not matrix, clause. This is the case in a number of conservative European languages, such as Latin, German and Russian. Many languages also have similar linking words commonly termed "relative pronouns" that agree in some way with the head noun, but do not adopt the case role of the embedded clause. In English, for example, the use of who vs. which agrees with the animacy of the head noun, but there is no case agreement except in the formal English contrast who vs. whom. Similarly, in Classical Arabic, there is a relative pronoun that agrees in number, gender, definiteness and case with the head noun (rather than taking the case role of the noun in the embedded clause). Languages with prototypical relative pronouns typically use the gapping strategy for indicating the role in the embedded clause, since the relative pronoun itself indicates the role by its case. (Classical Arabic, where the case marking indicates something else, uses a resumptive pronoun.) Some linguists prefer to use the term relative pronoun only for the prototypical cases (but in this case it is unclear what to call the non-prototypical cases).
- Directly inserting the embedded clause in the matrix clause at the appropriate position, with no word used to join them. This is common, for example, in English (cf. "The person I saw yesterday went home"), and is used in Classical Arabic in relative clauses that modify indefinite nouns.
- By nominalizing the relative clause (e.g. converting it to a participial construction). Generally, no relative pronoun or complementizer is used. This occurs, for example, in reduced relative clauses in English (e.g. "The person seen by me yesterday went home" or "The person planning to go home soon is my friend"). Formal German makes common use of such participial relative clauses, which can become extremely long. This is also the normal strategy in Turkish, which has sentences equivalent to "I ate the potato of Hasan's giving to Sina" (in place of "I ate the potato that Hasan gave to Sina"). This can be viewed as a situation in which the "complementizer" is attached to the verb of the embedded clause (e.g. in English, "-ing" or "-ed" can be viewed as a type of complementizer).

=== Position of the head noun with respect to the relative clause ===
The positioning of a relative clause before or after a head noun is related to the more general concept of branching in linguistics. Languages that place relative clauses after their head noun (so-called head-initial or VO languages) generally also have adjectives and genitive modifiers following the head noun, as well as verbs preceding their objects. French, Spanish and Arabic are prototypical languages of this sort. Languages that place relative clauses before their head noun (so-called head-final or OV languages) generally also have adjectives and genitive modifiers preceding the head noun, as well as verbs following their objects. Turkish and Japanese are prototypical languages of this sort. Not all languages fit so easily into these categories. English, for example, is generally head-first, but has adjectives preceding their head nouns, and genitive constructions with both preceding and following modifiers ("the friend of my father" vs. "my father's friend"). Chinese has the VO order, with verb preceding object, but otherwise is generally head-final.

Various possibilities for ordering are:

- Relative clause following the head noun, as in English, French or Arabic.
- Relative clause preceding the head noun, as in Turkish, Japanese, or Chinese.
- Head noun within the relative clause (an internally headed relative clause). An example of such a language is Navajo. These languages are said to have nonreduced relative clauses. These languages have a structure equivalent to "[I saw the person yesterday] went home".
- Adjoined relative clause. These languages have the relative clause completely outside the main clause, and use a correlative structure to link the two. These languages also have nonreduced relative clauses. Hindi, the most well-known such language, has a structure similar to "Which person I saw yesterday, that person went home" or (without fronting of the relativized noun in the relative clause) "I saw which person yesterday, that person went home". Another example is Warlpiri, which constructs relative clauses of a form similar to "I saw the man yesterday, which he was going home". However, it is sometimes said these languages have no relative clauses at all, since the sentences of this form can equally well translate as "I saw the man who was going home yesterday" or "I saw the man yesterday when/while he was going home".

== Accessibility hierarchy ==
The antecedent of the relative clause (that is, the noun that is modified by it) can in theory be the subject of the main clause, or its object, or any other verb argument. In many languages, however, especially rigidly left-branching, dependent-marking languages with prenominal relative clauses, there are major restrictions on the role the antecedent may have in the relative clause.

Edward Keenan and Bernard Comrie noted that these roles can be ranked cross-linguistically in the following order from most accessible to least accessible:

Subject > Direct Object > Indirect Object > Oblique > Genitive > Object of comparative

Ergative–absolutive languages have a similar hierarchy:

Absolutive > Ergative > Indirect Object > etc. (same as above)

This order is called the accessibility hierarchy. If a language can relativize positions lower in the accessibility hierarchy, it can always relativize positions higher up, but not vice versa. For example, Malagasy can relativize only subject and Chukchi only absolutive arguments, whilst Basque can relativize absolutives, ergatives and indirect objects, but not obliques or genitives or objects of comparatives. Similar hierarchies have been proposed in other circumstances, e.g. for pronominal reflexes.

English can relativize all positions in the hierarchy. Here are some examples of the NP and relative clause usage from English:

Position	With explicit relative pronoun	With omitted relative pronoun	In formal English
Subject	That's the woman [who ran away].	—	That's the woman [who ran away].
Direct object	That's the woman [who I saw yesterday].	That's the woman [I saw yesterday].	That's the woman [whom I saw yesterday].
Indirect object	That's the person [who I gave the letter to].	That's the person [I gave the letter to].	That's the person [to whom I gave the letter].
Oblique	That's the person [who I was talking about].	That's the person [I was talking about].	That's the person [about whom I was talking].
Genitive	That's the woman [whose brother I know].	—	That's the woman [whose brother I know].
Obj of Comp	That's the woman [who I am taller than].	That's the woman [I am taller than].	That's the woman [than whom I am taller].

Some other examples:

Position	Example
Subject	The girl [who came late] is my sister.
Direct object	I gave a rose to the girl [that Kate saw].
Indirect object	John knows the girl [I wrote a letter to].
Oblique	I found the rock [which the robbers had hit John over the head with].
Genitive	The girl [whose father died] told me she was sad.
Obj of Comp	The first person [I can't run faster than] will win a million dollars.

Languages that cannot relativize directly on noun phrases low in the accessibility hierarchy can sometimes use alternative voices to "raise" the relevant noun phrase so that it can be relativized. The most common example is the use of applicative voices to relativize obliques, but in such languages as Chukchi antipassives are used to raise ergative arguments to absolutive.

For example, a language that can relativize only subjects could say this:

- The girl [who likes me] came to visit.

But not:

- The girl [whom I like] came to visit.
- The girl [whom I gave a rose to] came to visit.
- The girl [whom I watched a movie with] came to visit.
- The girl [whose father I know] came to visit.
- The girl [whom I know the father of] came to visit. (equivalent to previous)
- The girl [whom I am taller than] came to visit.

These languages might form an equivalent sentence by passivization:

- The girl [who was liked by me] came to visit.
- The girl [who was given a rose by me] came to visit.
- The girl [who was watched a movie with by me] came to visit.
- The girl [who was known the father of by me] came to visit.
- The girl [who was been taller than by me] came to visit.

These passivized sentences get progressively more ungrammatical in English as they move down the accessibility hierarchy; the last two, in particular, are so ungrammatical as to be almost unparsable by English speakers. But languages with severe restrictions on which roles can be relativized are precisely those that can passivize almost any position, and hence the last two sentences would be normal in those languages.

A further example is languages that can relativize only subjects and direct objects. Hence the following would be possible:

- The girl [who I like] came to visit.

The other ungrammatical examples above would still be ungrammatical. These languages often allow an oblique object to be moved to the direct object slot by the use of the so-called applicative voice, much as the passive voice moves an oblique object to the subject position. The above examples expressed in an applicative voice might be similar to the following (in not necessarily grammatical English):

- The girl [who I gave a rose] came to visit.
- The girl [who I with-watched a movie] came to visit.
- The girl [who I (of-)know the father] came to visit.
- The girl [who I out-tall] came to visit.

Modern grammars may use the accessibility hierarchy to order productions—e.g. in Head-Driven Phrase Structure Grammar the hierarchy corresponds to the order of elements on the subcat list, and interacts with other principles in explanations of binding facts. The hierarchy also figures in Lexical Functional Grammar, where it is known as Syntactic Rank or the Relational Hierarchy.

== Examples ==
=== Indo-European languages ===
==== English ====
In English, a relative clause follows the noun it modifies. It is generally indicated by a relative pronoun at the start of the clause, although sometimes simply by word order. If the relative pronoun is the object of the verb in the relative clause, it comes at the beginning of the clause even though it would come at the end of an independent clause ("She is the woman whom I saw", not "She is the woman I saw whom").

The choice of relative pronoun can be affected by whether the clause modifies a human or non-human noun, by whether the clause is restrictive or not, and by the role (subject, direct object, or the like) of the relative pronoun in the relative clause.

- For a human antecedent, "who", "whom", or "that" is usually used ("She is the person who saw me", "He is the person whom I saw", "He is the person that I saw"). For a non-human antecedent, only "that" or "which" is used.
- For a non-human antecedent in a non-restrictive clause, only "which" is used ("The tree, which fell, is over there"); while either "which" or "that" may be used in a restrictive clause ("The tree which fell is over there", "The tree that fell is over there")—but some styles and prescriptive grammars require the use of "that" in the restrictive context.
- Of the relative pronoun pair "who" and "whom", the subjective case form ("who") is used if it is the subject of the relative clause ("She is the police officer who saw me"); and, in formal usage, the objective case form ("whom") if it is the object of the verb or preposition in the relative clause ("She is the police officer whom I saw", "She is the police officer whom I talked to", "She is the officer to whom I talked"); but in informal usage "whom" is often replaced by "who".

In English, as in some other languages (such as French; see below), non-restrictive relative clauses are set off with commas, but restrictive ones are not:

- "I met a woman and a man yesterday. The woman, who had a thick French accent, was very tall." (non-restrictive—does not narrow down who is being talked about)
- "I met two women yesterday, one with a thick French accent and one with a mild Italian one. The woman who had the thick French accent was very tall." (restrictive—adds information about who is being referred to)

The status of "that" as a relative pronoun is not universally agreed. Traditional grammars treat "that" as a relative pronoun, but not all contemporary grammars do: e.g. the Cambridge Grammar of the English Language (pp. 1056–7) makes a case for treating "that" as a subordinator instead of a relative pronoun; and the British National Corpus treats "that" as a subordinating conjunction even when it introduces relative clauses. One motivation for the different treatment of "that" is that there are differences between "that" and "which" (e.g., one can say "in which" but not "in that", etc.).

==== French ====
The system of relative pronouns in French is in similar in many ways to the system in English, but typically does not distinguish between human and non-humans.

When the pronoun is to act as the subject of the relative clause, qui is generally used, though lequel may be used instead for precision. This is less common than the use of lequel with direct objects, however, since many common verbs in French, but not regular verbs or the imperfect tense, have different forms even in speech depending on the grammatical number of their third person subjects.

J'ai vu l'homme qui est là. ("I saw the man who is there.")
J'ai vu la ville qui est là. ("I saw the city that is there.")

Contrary to English, the relative pronoun can never be omitted in French, not even when the relative clause is embedded in another relative clause.

Voilà ce que je crois qui est arrivé. ("Here is what I think Ø happened.") [literally: "Here is that which I think that happened."]

When the pronoun is to act as the direct object of the relative clause, que is generally used.

J'ai vu l'homme que tu as rencontré. ("I saw the man whom you met.")
Je suis allé au magasin qu'il aime. ("I went to the store that he likes.")

As mentioned before, lequel, which is inflected for grammatical gender and number, is sometimes used in order to give more precision. For example, any of the following is correct and would translate to "I talked to his/her father and mother, whom I already knew":

J'ai parlé avec son père et sa mère, laquelle (f. sing.) je connaissais déjà. [literally: "that which I already knew"]
J'ai parlé avec son père et sa mère, lesquels (m. pl.) je connaissais déjà. [literally: "those which I already knew"]
J'ai parlé avec son père et sa mère, que je connaissais déjà. [literally: "that I already knew"]

However, in the first sentence, the clause refers only to the mother; in the second, it refers to both parents; and in the third, as in the English sentence, it could refer either only to the mother, or to both parents.

When the pronoun is to act in a possessive sense, where the preposition de (of/from) would normally be used, the pronoun dont ("whose", "of which", "of whom") is used, but does not act as a determiner for the noun "possessed":

J'ai parlé avec une femme dont le fils est mon collègue. ("I spoke with a woman whose son I work with.") [literally: "I spoke with a woman of whom the son is my colleague."]

This construction is also used in non-possessive cases where the pronoun replaces an object marked by de:

C'est la chose dont j'ai parlé. ("That's the thing of which I spoke.")

More generally, in modern French, dont can signal the topic of the following clause, without replacing anything in this clause:

C'est un truc dont je crois qu'il est important. ("That's a thing about which I believe that it is important.")

When the pronoun is to act as the object of a preposition (other than when dont is used), lequel is generally used, though qui can be used if the antecedent is human.

Ce sont des gens sur lesquels on peut compter. ("These are people that can be depended on.") [literally: "on those which one can depend"]
Ce sont des gens sur qui on peut compter.

C'est une table sur laquelle on peut mettre beaucoup de choses. ("This is a table Ø you can put a lot of things on.") [literally: "on that which one can put many things"]
*C'est une table sur qui on peut mettre beaucoup de choses.

There exists a further complication when the antecedent is a non-human indefinite pronoun. In that case, lequel cannot be used because it must agree in gender with its head, and an indefinite pronoun has no gender. Instead, quoi, which usually means "what", is used.

C'est manifestement quelque chose à quoi il a beaucoup réfléchi. ("This is obviously something that he has thought a lot about.")
*C'est manifestement quelque chose à laquelle il a beaucoup réfléchi.

The same happens when the antecedent is an entire clause, also lacking gender.

Il m'a dit d'aller me faire voir, à quoi j'ai répondu que... ("He told me to get lost, to which I replied that...")

The preposition always appears before the pronoun, and the prepositions de and à (at/to) contract with lequel to form duquel and auquel, or with lesquel(le)s to form desquel(le)s and auxquel(le)s.

Many est-ce que questions in French underlyingly use relative clauses.

Qui est-ce que je vois là-bas? ("Who do I see over there?") [literally: "Who is that which I see over there?"]
Qu'est-ce que je peux faire? ("What can I do?") [literally: "What is that which I can do?"]
Qu'est-ce qui s'est cassé? ("What broke?") [literally: "What is that which is broken?"]

==== German ====
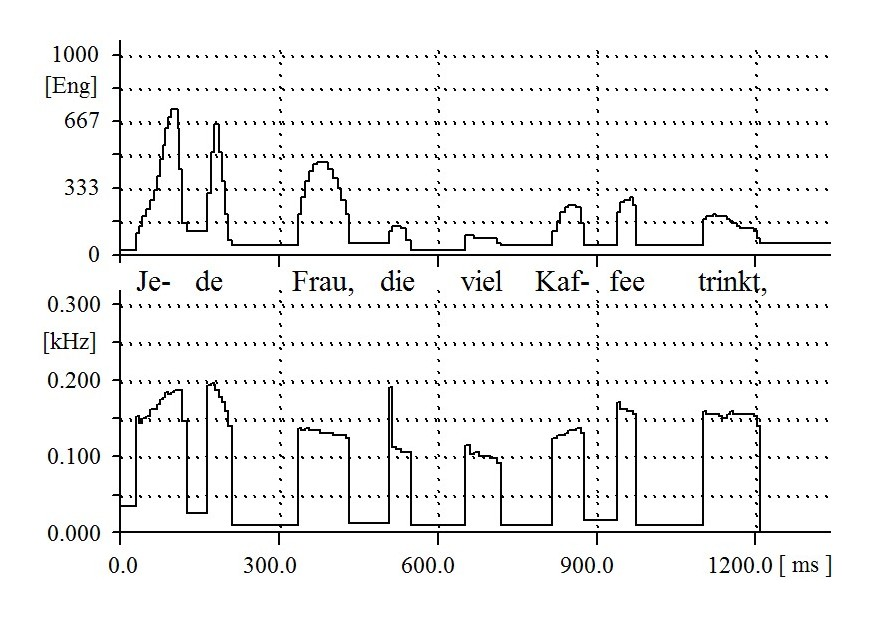
Intonation of German restrictive relative clauses

Aside from their highly inflected forms, German relative pronouns are less complicated than English. There are two varieties. The more common one is based on the definite article der, die, das, but with distinctive forms in the genitive (dessen, deren) and in the dative plural (denen). Historically this is related to English that. The second, which is more literary and used for emphasis, is the relative use of welcher, welche, welches, comparable with English which. As in most Germanic languages, including Old English, both of these varieties inflect according to gender, case and number. They take their gender and number from the noun which they modify, but the case from their function in their own clause.

Das Haus, in dem ich wohne, ist sehr alt.

The house in which I live is very old.

The relative pronoun dem is neuter singular to agree with Haus, but dative because it follows a preposition in its own clause. On the same basis, it would be possible to substitute the pronoun welchem.

However, German uses the uninflecting was ('what') as a relative pronoun when the antecedent is alles, etwas or nichts ('everything', 'something', 'nothing').

Alles, was Jack macht, gelingt ihm.

Everything that Jack does is a success.

In German, all relative clauses are marked with commas.

Alternatively, particularly in formal registers, participles (both active and passive) can be used to embed relative clauses in adjectival phrases:

Die von ihm in jenem Stil gemalten Bilder sind sehr begehrt

The pictures he painted in that style are highly sought after

Die Regierung möchte diese im letzten Jahr eher langsam wachsende Industrie weiter fördern

The government would like to further promote this industry, which has grown rather slowly over the last year.

Unlike English, which only permits relatively small participle phrases in adjectival positions (typically just the participle and adverbs), and disallows the use of direct objects for active participles, German sentences of this sort can embed clauses of arbitrary complexity.

==== Latin ====
In Latin, relative clauses follow the noun phrases they modify, and are always introduced using relative pronouns. Relative pronouns, like other pronouns in Latin, agree with their antecedents in gender and number, but not in case: a relative pronoun's case reflects its role in the relative clause it introduces, while its antecedent's case reflects the antecedent's role in the clause that contains the relative clause. (Nonetheless, it is possible for the pronoun and antecedent to be in the same case.) For example:

Urbēs, quae sunt magnae, videntur. (The cities, which are large, are being seen.)
Urbēs, quās vīdī, erant magnae. (The cities, which I saw, were large.)

In the former example, urbēs and quae both function as subjects in their respective clauses, so both are in the nominative case; and due to gender and number agreement, both are feminine and plural. In the latter example, both are still feminine and plural, and urbēs is still in the nominative case, but quae has been replaced by quās, its accusative-case counterpart, to reflect its role as the direct object of vīdī.

For more information on the forms of Latin relative pronouns, see the section on relative pronouns in the article on Latin declension.

==== Ancient Greek ====
Ancient Greek follows (almost) the same rules as Latin.

αἱ πόλεις, ἃς εἶδον, μεγάλαι εἰσίν.
hai póleis, hàs eîdon, megálai eisin.
The cities, which I saw are large.

However, there is a phenomenon in Ancient Greek called case attraction, where the case of the relative pronoun can be "attracted" to the case of its antecedent.

ἄξιοι τῆς ἐλευθερίας ἧς κέκτησθε
áxioi tês eleutheríās hês kéktēsthe
Worthy of the freedom (lit. 'of which') you have obtained. = Worthy of the freedom which you have obtained.

In this example, although the relative pronoun should be in the accusative case, as the object of "obtain", it is attracted to the genitive case of its antecedent ("of the freedom...").

The Ancient Greek relative pronoun ὅς, ἥ, ὅ (hós, hḗ, hó) is unrelated to the Latin word, since it derives from Proto-Indo-European *yos: in Proto-Greek, y before a vowel usually changed to h (debuccalization). Cognates include Sanskrit relative pronouns yas, yā, yad (where o changed to short a).

The Greek definite article ὁ, ἡ, τό (ho, hē, tó) has a different origin, since it is related to the Sanskrit demonstrative sa, sā and Latin is-tud.

Information that in English would be encoded with relative clauses could be represented with complex participles in Ancient Greek. This was made particularly expressive by the rich suite of participles available, with active and passive participles in present, past and future tenses. This is called the attributive participle.

==== Serbo-Croatian ====
Serbo-Croatian uses exactly the same principle as Latin does. The following sentences are the Latin examples translated to Serbo-Croatian (the same sentences apply to the Croatian, Serbian, Bosnian, and Montenegrin standard variants of the pluricentric language):

Gradovi, koji su veliki, vide se.
{the cities:NOM.M.PL} which:NOM.M.PL are:PR.3.PL large:NOM.M.PL see:PR.3.PL itself:REFL
"The cities, which are large, are being seen."

Gradovi, koje sam vidio, bili su veliki.
{the cities:NOM.M.PL} which:ACC.M.PL {I am:AUX.1.SG} saw:AP.M.SG were:AP.M.PL are:AUX.3.PL large:NOM.M.PL
"The cities, which I saw, were large."

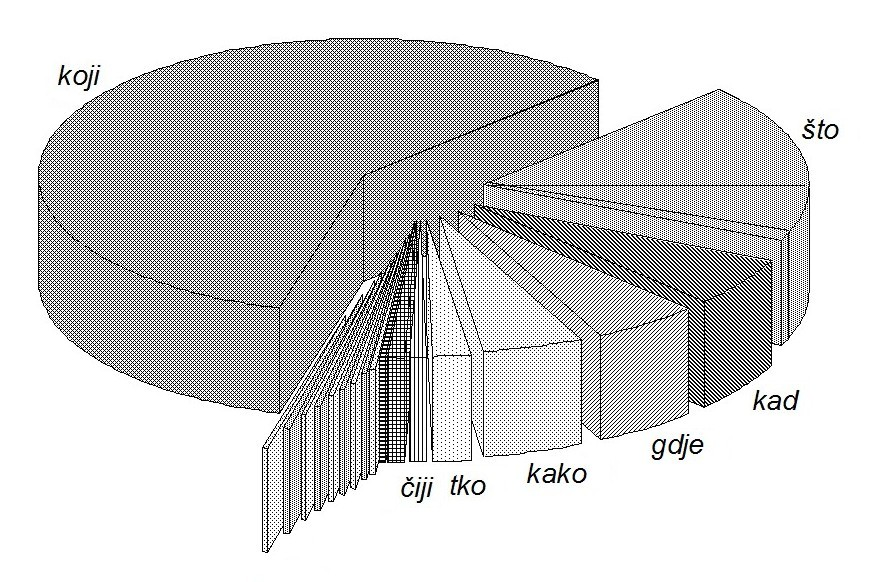
Frequency of relativizers in Serbo-Croatian

In the first sentence, koji is in the nominative, and in the second koje is in the accusative. Both words are two case forms of the same relative pronoun, that is inflicted for gender (here: masculine), number (here: plural), and case.

An alternative relativizing strategy is the use of the non-declinable word što 'that' to introduce a relative clause. This word is used together with a resumptive pronoun, i.e. a personal pronoun that agrees in gender and number with the antecedent, while its case form depends on its function in the relative clause. The resumptive pronoun never appears in subject function.

Onaj poznanik što si ga pozdravio...
that:NOM.M.SG acquaintance:NOM.M.SG that be:AUX.2.SG him:ACC greet:AP.M.SG
"That acquaintance that (whom) you have said 'hello' to..."

Relative clauses are relatively frequent in modern Serbo-Croatian since they have expanded as attributes at the expense of the participles performing that function. The most frequently used relative pronoun is koji. There are several ongoing changes concerning koji. One of them is the spread of the genitive-accusative syncretism to the masculine inanimate of the pronoun. The cause lies in the necessity to disambiguate the subject and the object by morphological means. The nominative-accusative syncretism of the form koji is inadequate, so the genitive form kojeg is preferred:

Auto koji je udario autobus
car:NOM/ACC.M.SG which:NOM/ACC.M.SG be:AUX.3.SG hit:AP.M.SG bus:NOM/ACC.M.SG

Auto kojeg je udario autobus
car:NOM/ACC.M.SG which:ACC/GEN.M.SG be:AUX.3.SG hit:AP.M.SG bus:NOM/ACC.M.SG
"Car hit by bus"

==== Celtic languages ====
The Celtic languages (at least the modern Insular Celtic languages) distinguish two types of relative clause: direct relative clauses and indirect relative clauses. A direct relative clause is used where the relativized element is the subject or the direct object of its clause (e.g. "the man who saw me", "the man whom I saw"), while an indirect relative clause is used where the relativized element is a genitival (e.g. "the man whose daughter is in the hospital") or is the object of a preposition (e.g. "the man to whom I gave the book"). Direct relative clauses are formed with a relative pronoun (unmarked for case) at the beginning; a gap (in terms of syntactic theory, a trace, indicated by (t) in the examples below) is left in the relative clause at the pronoun's expected position.

Irish

an fear a chonaic (t) mé
the man DIR-REL saw {} me
"the man who saw me"

Welsh

y dyn a welais
the man DIR-REL {I saw}
"the man whom I saw"

The direct relative particle "a" is not used with "mae" ("is") in Welsh; instead the form "sydd" or "sy'" is used:

y dyn sy'n blewog iawn
the man {DIR-REL + is} hairy very
"the man who is very hairy"

There is also a defective verb "piau" (usually lenited to "biau"), corresponding to "who own(s)":

y dyn piau castell anferth
the man {DIR-REL + owns} castle huge
"the man who owns a huge castle"

Indirect relative clauses are formed with a relativizer at the beginning; the relativized element remains in situ in the relative clause.

Irish

an fear a bhfuil a iníon san ospidéal
the man IND-REL is his daughter {in the} hospital
"the man whose daughter is in the hospital"

Welsh

y dyn y rhois y llyfr iddo
the man IND-REL {I gave} the book {to him}
"the man to whom I gave the book"

Although both the Irish relative pronoun and the relativizer are 'a', the relative pronoun triggers lenition of a following consonant, while the relativizer triggers eclipsis (see Irish initial mutations).

Both direct and indirect relative particles can be used simply for emphasis, often in answer to a question or as a way of disagreeing with a statement. For instance, the Welsh example above, "y dyn a welais" means not only "the man whom I saw", but also "it was the man (and not anyone else) I saw"; and "y dyn y rhois y llyfr iddo" can likewise mean "it was the man (and not anyone else) to whom I gave the book".

=== Semitic languages ===
==== Hebrew ====
In Biblical Hebrew, relative clauses were headed with the word asher, which could be either a relative pronoun or a relativizer. In later times, asher became interchangeable with the prefix she- (which is also used as a conjunction, with the sense of English that), and in Modern Hebrew, this use of she- is much more common than asher, except in some formal, archaic, or poetic writing. In meaning, the two are interchangeable; they are used regardless of whether the clause is modifying a human, regardless of their grammatical case in the relative clause, and regardless of whether the clause is restrictive.

Further, because Hebrew does not generally use its word for is, she- is used to distinguish adjective phrases used in epithet from adjective phrases used in attribution:

Ha-kise l'-yad-ekh. ("The chair is next to you." - lit., "The-chair [is] next-to-you.")
Ha-kise she-l'-yad-ekh shavur. ("The chair next to you is broken."—lit., "The-chair that-[is]-next-to-you [is] broken.")

(This use of she- does not occur with simple adjectives, as Hebrew has a different way of making that distinction. For example, Ha-kise adom means "The chair [is] red", while Ha-kis'e ha-adom shavur means "The red chair is broken"—literally, "The chair the red [is] broken.")

Since 1994, the official rules of Modern Hebrew (as determined by the Academy of the Hebrew Language) have stated that relative clauses are to be punctuated in Hebrew the same way as in English (described above). That is, non-restrictive clauses are to be set off with commas, while restrictive clauses are not:

Ha-kise, she-at yoshevet alav, shavur. ("The chair, which you are sitting on, is broken.")
Ha-kise she-at yoshevet alav shavur. ("The chair that you are sitting on is broken.")

Nonetheless, many speakers of Modern Hebrew still use the pre-1994 rules, which were based on the German rules (described above). Except for the simple adjective-phrase clauses described above, these speakers set off all relative clauses, restrictive or not, with commas:

Ha-kise, she-at yoshevet alav, shavur. ("The chair that you are sitting on is broken," or "The chair, which you are sitting on, is broken.")

One major difference between relative clauses in Hebrew and those in (for example) English is that in Hebrew, what might be called the "regular" pronoun is not always suppressed in the relative clause. To reuse the prior example:

Ha-kise, she-at yoshevet alav, shavur. (lit., "The chair, which you are sitting on it, [is] broken.")

More specifically, if this pronoun is the subject of the relative clause, it is always suppressed. If it is the direct object, then it is usually suppressed, though it is also correct to leave it in. (If it is suppressed, then the special preposition et, used to mark the direct object, is suppressed as well.) If it is the object of a preposition, it must be left in, because in Hebrew—unlike in English—a preposition cannot appear without its object. When the pronoun is left in, she- might more properly be called a relativizer than a relative pronoun.

The Hebrew relativizer she- 'that' "might be a shortened form of the Hebrew relativizer ‘asher 'that', which is related to Akkadian ‘ashru 'place' (cf. Semitic *‘athar). Alternatively, Hebrew ‘asher derived from she-, or it was a convergence of Proto-Semitic dhu (cf. Aramaic dī) and ‘asher [...] Whereas Israeli she- functions both as complementizer and relativizer, ashér can only function as a relativize."

==== Arabic ====
===== Literary Arabic =====
In Modern Standard and Classical Arabic there is a relative pronoun (in Arabic: الاسم الموصول al-ism al-mawṣūl) allaḏī (masculine singular), feminine singular allatī, masculine plural allaḏīna, feminine plural allawātī, masculine dual allaḏānī (nominative) / allaḏayni (accusative and genitive), feminine dual allatānī (nom.) / allataynī (acc. and gen.).

Its usage has two specific rules: it agrees with the antecedent in gender, number and case, and it is used only if the antecedent is definite. If the antecedent is indefinite, no relative pronoun is used. The former is called jumlat sila (conjunctive sentence) while the latter is called jumlat sifa (descriptive sentence).

الفتى الذي رأيته في الصف أمس غائب اليوم
al-fatā (a)lladhi ra’aytuhu fī (a)ṣ-ṣaffi ’amsi ġā’ibun al-yawma
"The boy I saw in class yesterday is missing today". (relative pronoun present)

هذا فتًى رأيته في الصف أمس
hāḏā fatan ra’aytu-hu fī (a)ṣ-ṣaffi ’amsi
"This is a boy I saw in class yesterday". (relative pronoun absent)

===== Colloquial Arabic =====
In Colloquial Arabic the multiple forms of the relative pronoun have been levelled in favour of a single form, a simple conjunction, which in most dialects is illi, and is never omitted. So in Palestinian Arabic the above sentences would be:

- alwalad illi shuftō fi (a)ssaff embārih ghāyeb alyōm
- hāda (i)l-walad illi shuftō fi (a)ssaff embārih

As in Hebrew, the regular pronoun referring to the antecedent is repeated in the relative clause - literally, "the boy whom I saw him in class..." (the -hu in ra'aituhu and the -ō in shuftō). The rules of suppression in Arabic are identical to those of Hebrew: obligatory suppression in the case that the pronoun is the subject of the relative clause, obligatory retention in the case that the pronoun is the object of a preposition, and at the discretion of the speaker if the pronoun is the direct object. The only difference from Hebrew is that, in the case of the direct object, it is preferable to retain the pronoun rather than suppress it.

=== Japonic languages ===
==== Japanese ====
Japanese does not employ relative pronouns to relate relative clauses to their antecedents. Instead, the relative clause directly modifies the noun phrase as an attributive verb, occupying the same syntactic space as an attributive adjective (before the noun phrase).

この おいしい 天ぷら
kono oishii tempura
"this delicious tempura"

姉が 作った 天ぷら
ane-ga tsukutta tempura
sister-SUBJ make-PAST tempura
"the tempura [that] my sister made"

天ぷらを 食べた 人
tempura-o tabeta hito
tempura-OBJ eat-PAST person
"the person who ate the tempura"

In fact, since so-called i-adjectives in Japanese can be analyzed as intransitive stative verbs, it can be argued that the structure of the first example (with an adjective) is the same as the others. A number of "adjectival" meanings, in Japanese, are customarily shown with relative clauses consisting solely of a verb or a verb complex:

光っている ビル
hikatte-iru biru
lit-be building
"an illuminated building"

濡れている 犬
nurete-iru inu
get_wet-be dog
"a wet dog"

Often confusing to speakers of languages which use relative pronouns are relative clauses which would in their own languages require a preposition with the pronoun to indicate the semantic relationship among the constituent parts of the phrase.

紅茶を 淹れる ため に お湯を 沸かした やかん
kōcha-o ireru tame ni oyu-o wakashita yakan
tea-OBJ make purpose for hot-water-OBJ boiled kettle
"the kettle I boiled water in for tea"

Here, the preposition "in" is missing from the Japanese ("missing" in the sense that the corresponding postposition would be used with the main clause verb in Japanese). Common sense indicates what the meaning is in this case, but the "missing preposition" can sometimes create ambiguity.

天ぷらを 作った 人
tempura-o tsukutta hito
tempura-OBJ made person
(1) "the person who made the tempura"
(2) "the person [someone] made the tempura for"

In this case, (1) is the context-free interpretation of choice, but (2) is possible with the proper context.

僕が 記事を 書いた レストラン
boku-ga kiji-o kaita resutoran
I-SUBJ article-OBJ wrote restaurant
(1) "a restaurant about which I wrote an article"
(2) "a restaurant in which I wrote an article"

Without more context, both (1) and (2) are equally viable interpretations of the Japanese sentence.

=== Caucasian languages ===
==== Georgian ====
In Georgian, there are two strategies for forming relative clauses. The first is similar to that of English or Latin: the modified noun is followed by a relativizer that inflects for its embedded case and may take a postposition. The relativized noun may be preceded by a determiner.

(ის) კაცი, რომელიც პარკში წავიდა, გაზეთს კითხულობს
(is) ḳac-i, romel-i-c ṗarḳ=ši c̣avida, gazet-s ḳitxulobs
(that.NOM) man-NOM which-NOM-REL park=to he.went newspaper-DAT he.reads.it
"the man who went to the park is reading the newspaper."

(ის) ქალი, რომელსაც წერილს დავუწერ, თბილისში ცხოვრობს
(is) kal-i, romel-sa-c c̣eril-s davuc̣er, tbilis=ši cxovrobs
(that.NOM) woman-NOM which-DAT-REL letter-DAT I.will.write.it.to.her Tbilisi-in she.lives
"the woman who I will write a letter to lives in Tbilisi."

ნინომ (ის) სკამი, რომელზეც ვზივარ, იყიდა
Nino-m (is) sḳam-i, romel=ze-c vzivar, iqida
Nino-ERG (that.NOM) chair-NOM which=on-REL I.sit she.bought.it
"Nino bought the chair I am sitting in."

A second, more colloquial, strategy is marked by the invariant particle რომ rom. This particle is generally the second word of the clause, and since it does not decline, is often followed by the appropriately cased third-person pronoun to show the relativized noun's role in the embedded clause. A determiner precedes the relativized noun, which is also usually preceded by the clause as a whole.

წერილს რომ მას დავუწერ, ის ქალი თბილისში ცხოვრობს
c̣̣eril-s rom mas davuc̣̣er, is kal-i tbilis=ši cxovrobs
letter-DAT REL 3S.DAT I.will.write.it.to.her that.NOM woman-NOM Tbilisi-in she.lives
"the woman who I will write a letter to lives in Tbilisi."

მე რომ მასზე ვზივარ, ის სკამი ნინომ იყიდა
me rom mas=ze vzivar, is sḳam-i Nino-m iqida
1S REL 3S.DAT=on I.sit that.NOM chair-NOM Nino-ERG she.bought.it
"Nino bought the chair I am sitting in."

Such relative clauses may be internally headed. In such cases, the modified noun moves into the clause, taking the appropriate declension for its role therein (thus eliminating the need for the third person pronouns in the above examples), and leaves behind the determiner (which now functions as a pronoun) in the matrix clause.

ქალს რომ წერილს დავუწერ, ის თბილისში ცხოვრობს
kal-s rom c̣̣eril-s davuc̣̣er, is tbilis=ši cxovrobs
woman-DAT REL letter-DAT I.will.write.it.to.her 3S.NOM Tbilisi-in she.lives
"the woman who I will write a letter to lives in Tbilisi."

=== Austronesian languages ===
==== Indonesian ====
Indonesian, a zero-copula language that does not mark verb tense, allows a variety of types of relative clause, normally restrictive. They are usually introduced by the relative pronoun yang, which stands for "who"/"which"/"what"/"that".

orang yang membangun rumah itu
person who build house that
"the person who built/is building that house"

Yang is not allowed as the object of a relative clause, so that Indonesian cannot exactly reproduce structures such as "the house that Jack built". Instead, a passive form of construction must be used:

rumah yang dibangun {} Jack
house that built [by] Jack

Relative clauses with no antecedent to yang are possible:

yang paling mengejutkan warnanya
what most surprising its-colour
"what is most surprising is its colour"

yang didengarnya mengejutkan sekali
what heard-by-him surprising very
"what he heard was very surprising"

==== Tagalog ====
Tagalog uses the gapping strategy to form relative clauses, with the complementizer, na / =ng 'that', separating the head, which is the noun being modified, from the actual relative clause. In (1a) below, lalaki 'man' serves as the head, while nagbigay ng bigas sa bata 'gave rice to the child' is the relative clause.

lalaki =ng nagbigay ____ ng bigas sa bata
man COMP ACT.gave {} ACC rice DAT child
"man that gave rice to the child"

Nagbigay ang lalaki ng bigas sa bata.
ACT.gave NOM man ACC rice DAT child
"The man gave rice to the child."

The gap inside the relative clause corresponds to the position that the noun acting as the head would have normally taken, had it been in a declarative sentence. In (1a), the gap is in subject position within the relative clause. This corresponds to the subject position occupied by ang lalaki 'the man' in the declarative sentence in (1b).

There is a constraint in Tagalog on the position from which a noun can be relativized and in which a gap can appear: A noun has to be the subject within the relative clause in order for it to be relativized. The phrases in (2) are ungrammatical because the nouns that have been relativized are not the subjects of their respective relative clauses. In (2a), the gap is in direct object position, while in (2b), the gap is in indirect object position.

* bigas na nagbigay ang lalaki ____ sa bata
{} rice COMP ACT.gave NOM man {} DAT child
for: "rice that the man gave to the child"

* bata =ng nagbigay ang lalaki ng bigas ____
{} child COMP ACT.gave NOM man ACC rice {}
for: "child that the man gave rice to"

The correct Tagalog translations for the intended meanings in (2) are found in (3), where the verbs have been passivized in order to raise the logical direct object in (3a) and the logical indirect object in (3b) to subject position. (Tagalog can have more than one passive voice form for any given verb.)

bigas na ibinigay ng lalaki sa bata
rice COMP PAS.gave GEN man DAT child
"rice that the man gave to the child"
(or: "rice that was given to the child by the man")

bata =ng binigyan ng lalaki ng bigas
child COMP gave.PAS GEN man ACC rice
"child that the man gave rice to"
(or: "child that was given rice to by the man")

Tagalog relative clauses can be left-headed, as in (1a) and (3), right-headed, as in (4), or internally headed, as in (5).

nagbigay ng bigas sa bata na lalaki
ACT.gave ACC rice DAT child COMP man
"man that gave rice to the child"

nagbigay na lalaki ng bigas sa bata
ACT.gave COMP man ACC rice DAT child
"man that gave rice to the child"

nagbigay ng bigas na lalaki sa bata
ACT.gave ACC rice COMP man DAT child
"man that gave rice to the child"

In (4), the head, lalaki 'man', is found after or to the right of the relative clause, nagbigay ng bigas sa bata 'gave rice to the child'. In (5), the head is found in some position inside the relative clause. When the head appears to the right of or internally to the relative clause, the complementizer appears to the left of the head. When the head surfaces to the left of the relative clause, the complementizer surfaces to the right of the head.

There are exceptions to the subjects-only constraint to relativization mentioned above. The first involves relativizing the possessor of a noun phrase within the relative clause.

bata =ng nasugatan ang daliri ____
child COMP injured.PAS NOM finger {}
"child whose finger was injured"

In (6), the head, bata 'child', is the owner of the injured finger. The phrase ang daliri 'the finger' is the subject of the verb, nasugatan 'was injured'.

Another exception involves relativizing the oblique noun phrase.

ospital (na) kung saan ipinanganak si Juan
hospital COMP Q-COMP where PAS.bore NOM Juan
"hospital where Juan was born"

Nagtanong siya kung saan ipinanganak si Juan.
ACT.asked 3SG.NOM Q-COMP where PAS.bore NOM Juan
"She asked where Juan was born."

Ipinanganak si Juan sa ospital.
PAS.bore NOM Juan LOC hospital
"Juan was born at the hospital."

Saan ipinanganak si Juan?
where PAS.bore NOM Juan
"Where was Juan born?"

When an oblique noun phrase is relativized, as in (7a), na 'that', the complementizer that separates the head from the relative clause, is optional. The relative clause itself is also composed differently. In the examples in (1a), and in (3) to (6), the relative clauses are simple declaratives that contain a gap. However, the relative clause in (7a) looks more like an indirect question, complete with the interrogative complementizer, kung 'if', and a pre-verbally positioned WH-word like saan 'where', as in (7b). The sentence in (7c) is the declarative version of the relative clause in (7a), illustrating where the head, ospital 'hospital', would have been "before" relativization. The question in (7d) shows the direct question version of the subordinate indirect question in (7b).

==== Hawaiian ====
Relative clauses in Hawaiian are avoided unless they are short.

If in English a relative clause would have a copula and an adjective, in Hawaiian the antecedent is simply modified by the adjective: "The honest man" instead of "the man who is honest". If the English relative clause would have a copula and a noun, in Hawaiian an appositive is used instead: "Paul, an apostle" instead of "Paul, who was an apostle".

If the English relative pronoun would be the subject of an intransitive or passive verb, in Hawaiian a participle is used instead of a full relative clause: "the people fallen" instead of "the people who fell"; "the thing given" instead of "the thing that was given". But when the relative clause's antecedent is a person, the English relative pronoun would be the subject of the relative clause, and the relative clause's verb is active and transitive, a relative clause is used and it begins with the relative pronoun nana: The one who me (past) sent = "the one who sent me".

If in English a relative pronoun would be the object of a relative clause, in Hawaiian the possessive form is used so as to treat the antecedent as something possessed: the things of me to have seen = "the things that I saw"; Here is theirs to have seen = This is what they saw".

=== Andean languages ===
==== Aymara ====
thuquñap punchu
dance-INF-3.POSS poncho
"the poncho he is dancing with"

=== Chinese ===
==== Mandarin ====
In Mandarin Chinese, the relative clause is similar to other adjectival phrases in that it precedes the noun that it modifies, and ends with the relative particle de (的). If the relative clause is missing a subject but contains an object (in other words, if the verb is transitive), the main-clause noun is the implied subject of the relative clause:

种 水果 的 农人
zhòng shuǐguǒ de nóngrén
grow fruit PTCL farmer
"the fruit-growing farmer" or "the farmer who grows fruit"

If the object but not the subject is missing from the relative clause, the main-clause noun is the implied object of the relative clause:

他们 种 的 水果
tāmen zhòng de shuǐguǒ
they grow PTCL fruit
"the by-them-grown fruit" or "the fruit that they grow"

If both the subject and the object are missing from the relative clause, then the main-clause noun could either be the implied subject or the implied object of the relative clause; sometimes which is intended is clear from the context, especially when the subject or object of the verb must be human and the other must be non-human:

(用) 今天 赢 的 钱 来 付 房租
(yòng) jīntiān yíng de qián lái fù fángzū
(use) today win PTCL money in-order-to pay house-rent
"the won-today money pays the rent" or "the money that was won today pays the rent"

But sometimes ambiguity arises when it is not clear from the context whether the main-clause noun is intended as the subject or the object of the relative clause:

昨天 批评 的 人 都 不 在 这里
zuótiān pīping de rén dōu bu zài zhèlǐ
yesterday criticize PTCL person all not at here
"the people who criticized [others] yesterday are all not here" or "the people whom [others] criticized yesterday are all not here"

However, the first meaning (in which the main-clause noun is the subject) is usually intended, as the second can be unambiguously stated using a passive voice marker:

昨天 被 批评 的 人 都 不 在 这里
zuótiān bèi pīping de rén dōu bu zài zhèlǐ
yesterday PASS criticize PTCL person all not at here
"the people who were criticized yesterday are all not here"

Sometimes a relative clause has both a subject and an object specified, in which case the main-clause noun is the implied object of an implied preposition in the relative clause:

我 写 信 的 毛笔
wǒ xiě xìn de máobǐ
I write letter PTCL brushpen
the brushpen that I write letters with

It is also possible to include the preposition explicitly in the relative clause, but in that case it takes a pronoun object (a personal pronoun with the function of a relative pronoun):

我 替 他 画 画 的 人
wǒ tì tā huà huà de rén
I for her/him draw picture PTCL person
"the person for whom I drew the picture"

Free relative clauses are formed in the same way, omitting the modified noun after the particle de. As with bound relative clauses, ambiguity may arise; for example, 吃的; chī de "eat (particle)" may mean "that which is eaten", i.e. "food", or "those who eat".

=== Creoles ===
==== Hawaiian Creole English ====
In Hawaiian Creole English, an English-based creole also called Hawaiian Pidgin or simply Pidgin, relative clauses work in a way that is similar to, but not identical to, the way they work in English. As in English, a relative pronoun that serves as the object of the verb in the relative clause can optionally be omitted: For example,

Ai neva si da buk daet Lisa wen bai
I never see the book that Lisa (past) buy
I didn't see the book that Lisa bought

can also be expressed with the relative pronoun omitted, as

Ai neva si da buk Lisa wen bai
I never see the book Lisa (past) buy
I didn't see the book Lisa bought

However, relative pronouns serving as the subject of a relative clause show more flexibility than in English; they can be included, as is mandatory in English, they can be omitted, or they can be replaced by another pronoun. For example, all of the following can occur and all mean the same thing:

Get wan nada grl hu no kaen ste stil
There's one other girl who no can stay still
There's another girl who cannot stay still

Get wan nada grl no kaen ste stil
There's one other girl no can stay still

Get wan nada grl shi no kaen ste stil
There's one other girl she no can stay still

==== Gullah ====
In Gullah, an English-based creole spoken along the southeastern coast of the United States, no relative pronoun is normally used for the subject of a relative clause. For example:

Duh him cry out so
It him cry out so
It's he who cries out so

Enty duh dem shum dey?
Ain't it them {saw him} there?
Isn't it they who saw him there?

== See also ==
- Long-distance dependencies
- Reduced relative clause
