= Resumptive pronoun =

Use of a pronoun tied to an antecedent

A resumptive pronoun is a personal pronoun appearing in a relative clause, which restates the antecedent after a pause or interruption (such as an embedded clause, series of adjectives, or a wh-island), as in This is the girl that whenever it rains, she cries.

Resumptive pronouns have been described as "ways of salvaging a sentence that a speaker has started without realizing that it is impossible or at least difficult to finish it grammatically". An English speaker might use a resumptive pronoun in order to prevent violations of syntactic constraints.

In many languages, resumptive pronouns are necessary for a sentence to be grammatical, and they help in interpretation and performance of particular syntactic conditions.

== Defining the resumptive pronoun ==
Resumptive pronouns are pronouns that become more common the deeper the relative clause is embedded within the sentence because of greater processing constraints. When a relative clause is deeply embedded, the sentence is longer and it is more difficult to understand what is being modified by the relative clause. This added level, or additional distance, makes processing the sentence more difficult. These pronouns may not be actually grammatical in some languages like English, but are inserted into some sentences for clarity when there is a great deal of embedding or distance.

=== Relationship of resumptive pronouns and traces ===
Crucial to understanding resumptive pronouns is grasping the concept of their counterpart: the trace. Since resumptive pronouns and traces may not be differentiated in the English lexicon, the definition of one requires information about the other. When movement occurs in English sentences an invisible place-marker is left, called a trace. An example of movement that would result in a trace would be when an auxiliary verb is moved from a main clause to the beginning of a sentence to form a question phrase. A trace is an empty category that maintains a position in a sentence even though, in some languages, there is no surface level evidence of that linguistic element. Traces represent the pronoun that would have been present in the embedded clause, or before the wh-movement, that is removed from the surface representation of the sentence. As a result, in accordance with binding theory, the empty position of a trace must still be co-indexed with the preceding noun that it refers to in D-structure since they refer to the same entity.

  2. a) The man [whoi John saw ti.]
     b) *The man [whoi John saw himi.][4]

t = trace
i = co-indexed

=== Two competing accounts of resumptive pronouns ===
There are two main views regarding the existence of resumptive pronouns. Some linguists believe that resumptive pronouns occur as a result of syntactic processing, while others believe they are the result of grammatical structure and are actually the pronunciation of a trace. In terms of grammatical processing, speakers use resumptive pronouns to clarify syntactically complicated sentences by using a resumptive pronoun as a hook back to the antecedent. This point of view sees resumptive pronouns as a kind of helper that is inserted into the sentence in order to make understanding the sentence easier for speakers. The second view looks at the underlying syntactic structure of the sentence, and views the resumptive pronouns as audible instances of an invisible underlying form. From the structural perspective, resumptive pronouns have been called a "cross between a trace morpheme and a regular pronoun". A conceivable way of approaching resumptive pronouns is to say that they are of the same syntactic category as gaps or traces, and that they get the same semantic translation. The only difference would be that certain gaps get 'spelled out' as pronouns for clarity. Resumptive pronouns are syntactically and semantically pronouns, and they differ in both these respects from gaps.

== Example sentences ==
The following examples are based on sentences provided in the work by McKee & McDaniel (2001)

 3. a) That is [the boyi that ti cries loudly.]
    b) *That is [the boyi that hei cries loudly.]

Sentence (a) shows a trace, where the pronoun has been removed from the embedded clause. In sentence (b), the word him represents the pronoun that would be referred to as a resumptive pronoun if it remained in the sentence. However, as was stated previously, traces and resumptive pronouns appear in complementary distribution, so for the sentence to be grammatical with a trace in (a), it must be ungrammatical when the resumptive pronoun fills that same position in (b). Sentences (c) and (d) operate similarly, and are demonstrated in the X-bar theory trees below.

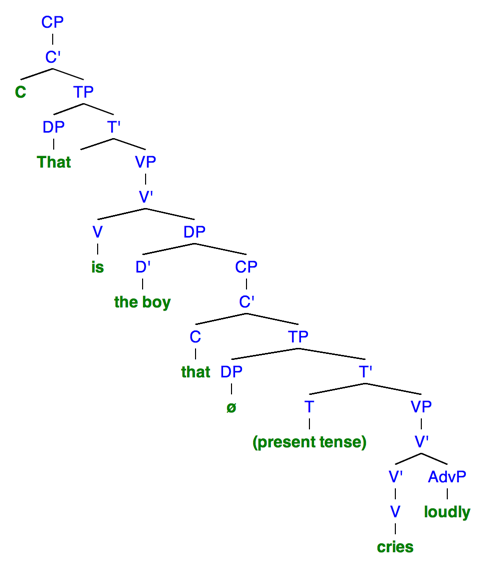
Sentence 3A: This syntactic tree of the sentence "That is the boy that cries loudly" demonstrates the structure when there is no resumptive pronoun used. To denote a null category, "ø" is used.

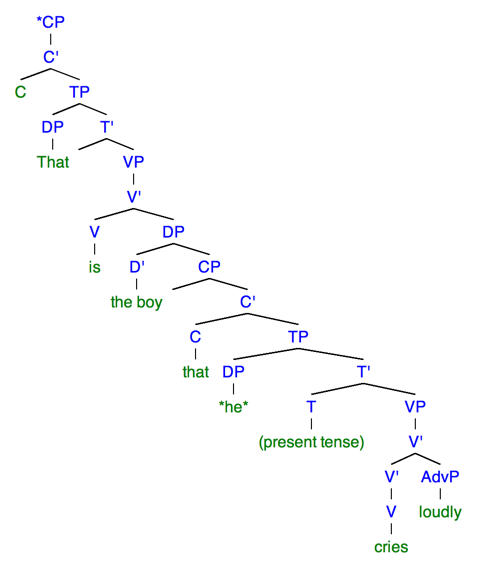
Sentence 3B: This syntactic tree of the sentence "*That is the boy that he cries loudly" demonstrates the structure when there is resumptive pronoun used. To denote a null category, "ø" is used. the "*" marks an ungrammatical sentence.

== Theories of resumptive pronoun distribution ==
Through a brief overview of resumptive pronouns in Swedish, Zaenen, Engdahl & Maling (1981) conclude that in some languages resumptive pronoun usage is not a case of anaphoric binding. In fact, they indicate that the relationship between a wh-word and a resumptive pronoun is actually akin to the relationship between a wh-word and a trace (an empty category that maintains a position in a sentence) that exists in English. Furthermore, they state that even though resumptive pronouns typically occur in syntactic islands, this is not because of switch in the category of binding.

The issues with resumptive pronoun extractability clearly follow from syntactic principles. Furthermore, this factor is naturally described within the Minimalist program, where the possibility of one structure can affect the possibility of another. In pre-Minimalist frameworks where derivations are independent of each other, this type of relation between two structures was unaccounted for; that is, there was no syntactic account of the ungrammaticality of cases like (5b). The independence of (5a) and (5b) implied that (5b) should be as good as (6b), regardless of whether resumptive pronouns are marginal in English. However, in the Minimalist framework, derivations that originate from the same numeration (i.e. set of lexical items) compete with one another so that the least costly derivation blocks the other(s). Therefore, if each resumptive–trace pair in the patterns exemplified in (5) and (6) is analyzed as originating from the same numeration, the complementarity has an account.

To develop this account we must claim that resumptive pronouns and traces are not differentiated in the English lexicon. If they were, the two versions would derive from different numerations and so would not compete.

== Distribution of resumptive pronouns ==
Resumptive pronouns in English behave differently from those in some other languages. In many contexts resumptive pronouns are judged to be ungrammatical by native speakers and they cannot be in the same binding domain or clause as the pronoun to which they refer. They do not usually occur in main clauses, but generally in relative clauses in some languages. In fact, in English, "relative clauses with resumptive pronouns are officially ungrammatical [...] However, they are in fact not uncommon in speech". However, their grammaticality is influenced by linear distance from the subject, embedded depth, and extractability.

1. Distance – Processing constraints between the distance of the antecedent and the pronoun.
2. Extractability – The acceptability of a trace.
3. Island Constraints – The movement capability of WH-words.

In a relative clause, resumptive pronouns are generally not seen as grammatical, however their level of grammaticality improves as they get farther from the head. Thus, (4b) seems preferable to (4a). Some improvement in whether a native speaker judges resumptive pronouns as grammatical may also result when the resumptive pronoun is embedded, as in (4c). The following examples are based on sentences provided in the work by McKee & McDaniel (2001)

  4 a) *This is the cameli that hei likes Oscar.
    b) This is the cameli that maybe, maybe, maybe, maybe hei likes Oscar.
    c) This is the cameli that I think hei likes Oscar.

Since distance is generally irrelevant to syntactic principles, it is difficult to build a grammatical account of English resumptive pronouns in such terms. The factor that seems to affect the distribution of resumptives in English most is extractability (i.e., whether a trace is acceptable). Resumptive pronouns are therefore generally in complementary distribution with traces. In (5), where the trace is possible, the resumptive pronoun is not; in (6), where the trace is not possible because of island constraints, the resumptive pronoun is.

  5. a) That's the girli that I like ti .
     b) *That's the girli that I like heri.

   6. a) *This is the girli that I don't know what ti  said.
      b) This is the girli that I don't know what shei said.

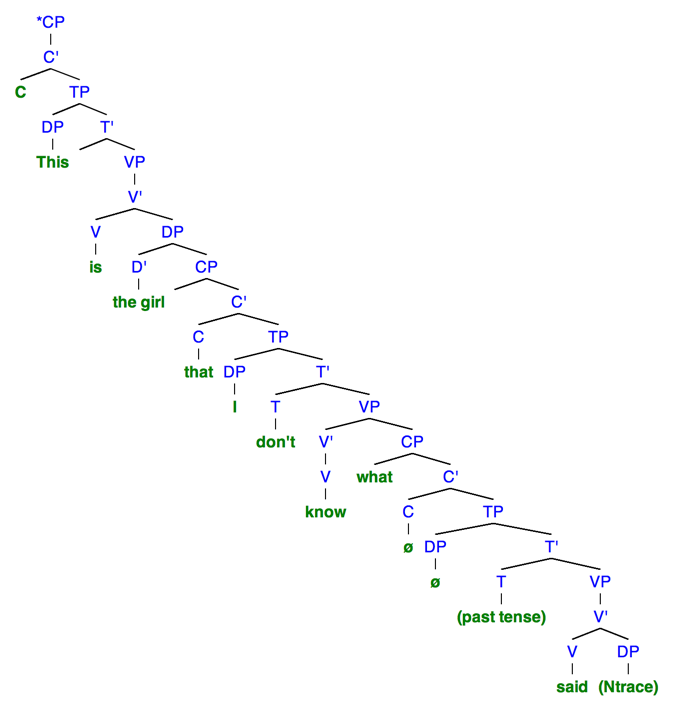
Sentence 6A: This syntactic tree of the sentence "*This is the girl that I don't know what said" demonstrates the structure when there is no obligatory resumptive pronoun used. To denote a null category, "ø" is used. The "*" marks an ungrammatical sentence

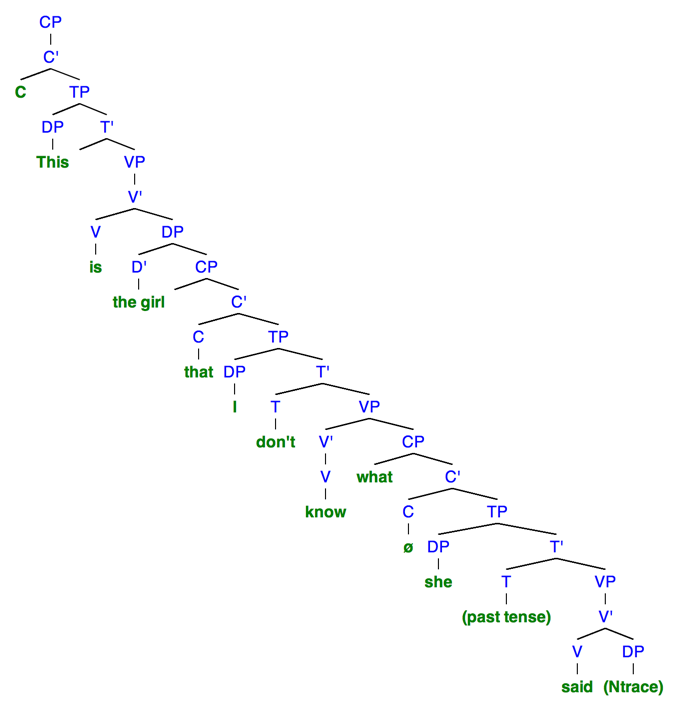
Sentence 6B: This syntactic tree of the sentence "This is the girl that I don't know what she said" demonstrates the structure when there is an obligatory resumptive pronoun used. To denote a null category, "ø" is used.

== Distribution in other languages ==
The use of resumptive pronouns and the resumptive pronoun strategy is "marginal" in the English language, but "common in colloquial English where binding theory prohibits wh-movement". The phenomenon is found more readily in other languages; in some of them it is the normal way of forming relative clauses. See Relative clause → Pronoun retention type.

In some languages, resumptive pronouns and traces seem to alternate relatively freely, as the Romani examples in (7) illustrate.

Ake i haj so mangav.
here the girl that I-like
'Here's the girl that I like.'

Ake i haj so mangav la.
here the girl that I-like her
'Here's the girl that I like [her]'.

Yiddish is another example of a language that uses resumptive pronouns readily, as can be seen in the example below.

...a yid vos er iz geven a groyser lamdn un a gvir...
...a Jew that he is been a big scholar and a rich-man...
'...a guy who [he] was a big scholar and a rich man...'

Some languages, such as Italian, features grammatical resumption in some situations other than relative clauses. In the example below, the resumptive clitic pronoun lo (which refers back to the topicalized object) is required for the sentence to be grammatical. However, the use of object resumptive pronouns is shunned in formal writing.

Mario lo ho visto domenica
'Mario him I saw on Sunday'

== See also ==
- Syntax
- Linguistics
- Pronouns
- Relative clause

== Sources ==
- Beltrama, A (2013). "Intrusive but not intruders. The processing of resumptive pronouns in Italian and English". University of Chicago: 14–15.
- Chomsky, Noam; Wise, Michael J. (1982). "Some concepts and consequences of the theory of government and binding". Book 6. Linguistic Inquiry Monograph. MIT Press. ISBN 978-0262530422.
- Chomsky, Noam (1995). "The minimalist program". Book 28. Linguistic Inquiry Monograph. Cambridge, MA: MIT Press. ISBN 978-0262531283.
- McKee, Cecile; McDaniel, Dana (2001). "Resumptive pronouns in English relative clauses". Language Acquisition. 9 (2): 113–156. doi:10.1207/S15327817LA0902_01. JSTOR 20011506. S2CID 143402998.
- Prince, E. F. (1991). "Syntax and discourse: A look at resumptive pronouns". Proceedings of the 16th Annual Meeting of the Berkeley Linguistics Society. Berkeley Linguistics Society: 482–497. ISBN 978-9991111698.
- Sharvit, Yael (1999). "Resumptive pronouns in relative clauses". Natural Language & Linguistic Theory. 17 (3). Kluwer Academic Publishers: 587–612. doi:10.1023/A:1006226031821. S2CID 169736813.
- Zaenen, Annie; Engdahl, Elisabet; Maling, Joan M. (1981). "Resumptive pronouns can be syntactically bound". Linguistic Inquiry. 12 (4): 679–682. JSTOR 4178253.
