= Relativizer =

Concept in linguistics

In linguistics, a relativizer (abbreviated REL or RELZ) is a type of conjunction that introduces a relative clause. For example, in English, the conjunction that may be considered a relativizer in a sentence such as "I have one that you can use." Relativizers do not appear, at least overtly, in all languages; even in languages that do have overt or pronounced relativizers, they do not necessarily appear all of the time. For these reasons it has been suggested that in some cases, a "zero relativizer" may be involved, meaning that a relativizer is implied in the grammar but is omitted in speech or writing. For example, the word that can be omitted in the above English example, producing "I have one you can use", using (on this analysis) a zero relativizer.

== History ==
Perhaps as early as 1712 but at least as early as 1761, numerous terms have been used for certain lexical items that introduce various clauses. One such term is relative pronoun, which was coined in the 18th century and gained widespread usage in the early to mid-19th century. A clause marker is another term that has been used to describe an item that introduces a clause. Beginning in 1938, relativizer emerged as a term that now competes with relative pronoun. Despite that contrasting nomenclature and notwithstanding their disparate lexical categories, relativizers and relative pronouns essentially perform the same function by way of introducing a relative clause.

=== Promotional analysis ===
The promotional analysis is a transformational analysis from 1973 depicting relative clauses in English, and how relative pronouns are introduced into the embedded clause. This analysis assumes that there is no overt head noun in the deep structure of the main clause. In order to form a relative construction, the noun phrase from the embedded clause is promoted to the empty head of the noun phrase of the main clause. From there, a corresponding relative pronoun leaves a trace in the space of the vacated noun phrase in the embedded clause. For example:

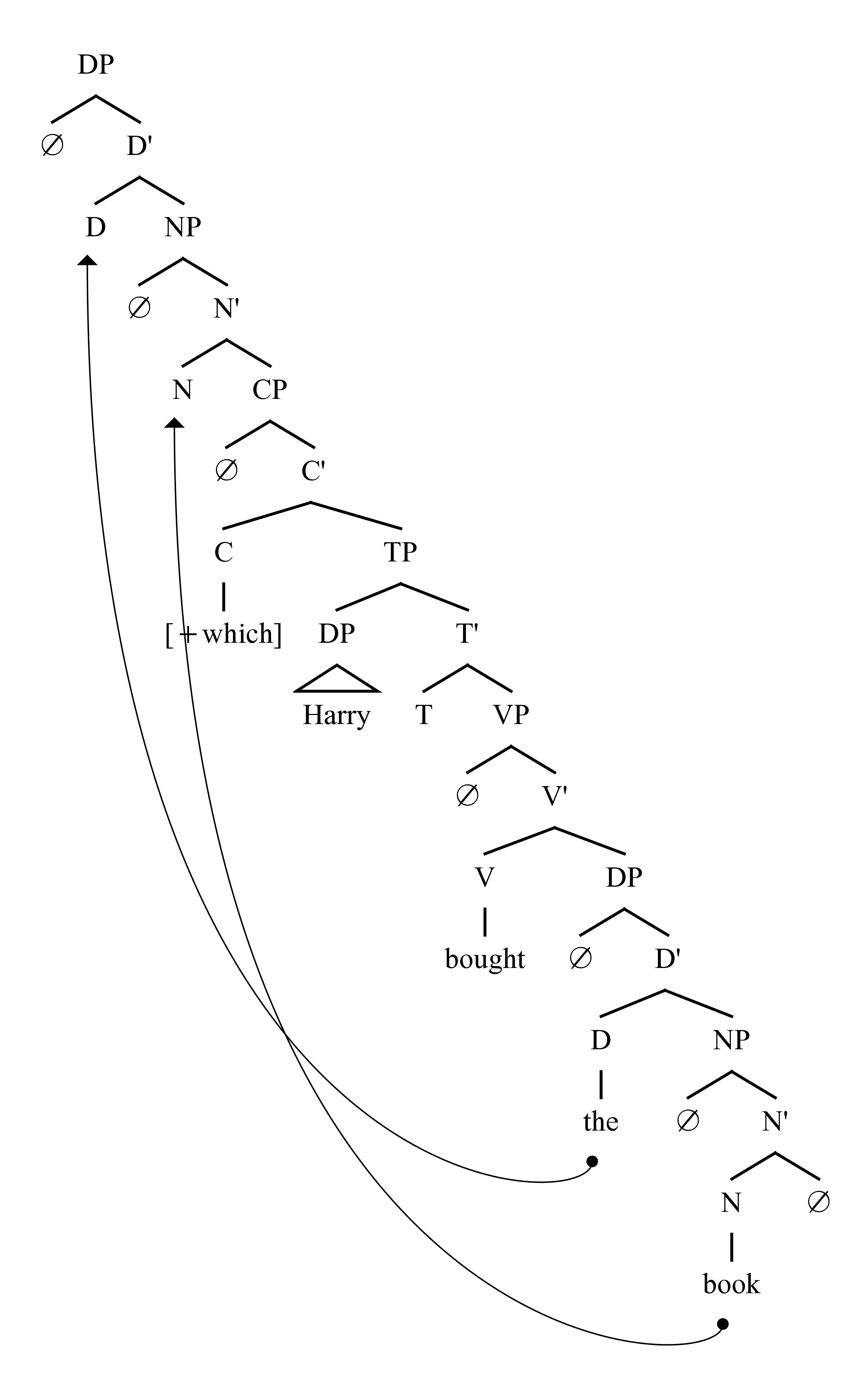
Figure 1: Tree displaying Promotional Analysis

=== Matching analysis ===
The Matching Analysis is another type of transformational analysis from the 1970s, which was in competition with the Promotional Analysis at that time. In this analysis the relative pronoun is introduced into the embedded clause by corresponding or matching to the head noun in the main clause. This is done by taking the noun phrase from the embedded sentence in the deep structure that matches the head noun in the noun phrase of the main clause, and replacing it with a relative pronoun. The relative pronoun thus co-references the head noun in the main clause. Finally, the relative pronoun is moved to the clause-initial position. For example:

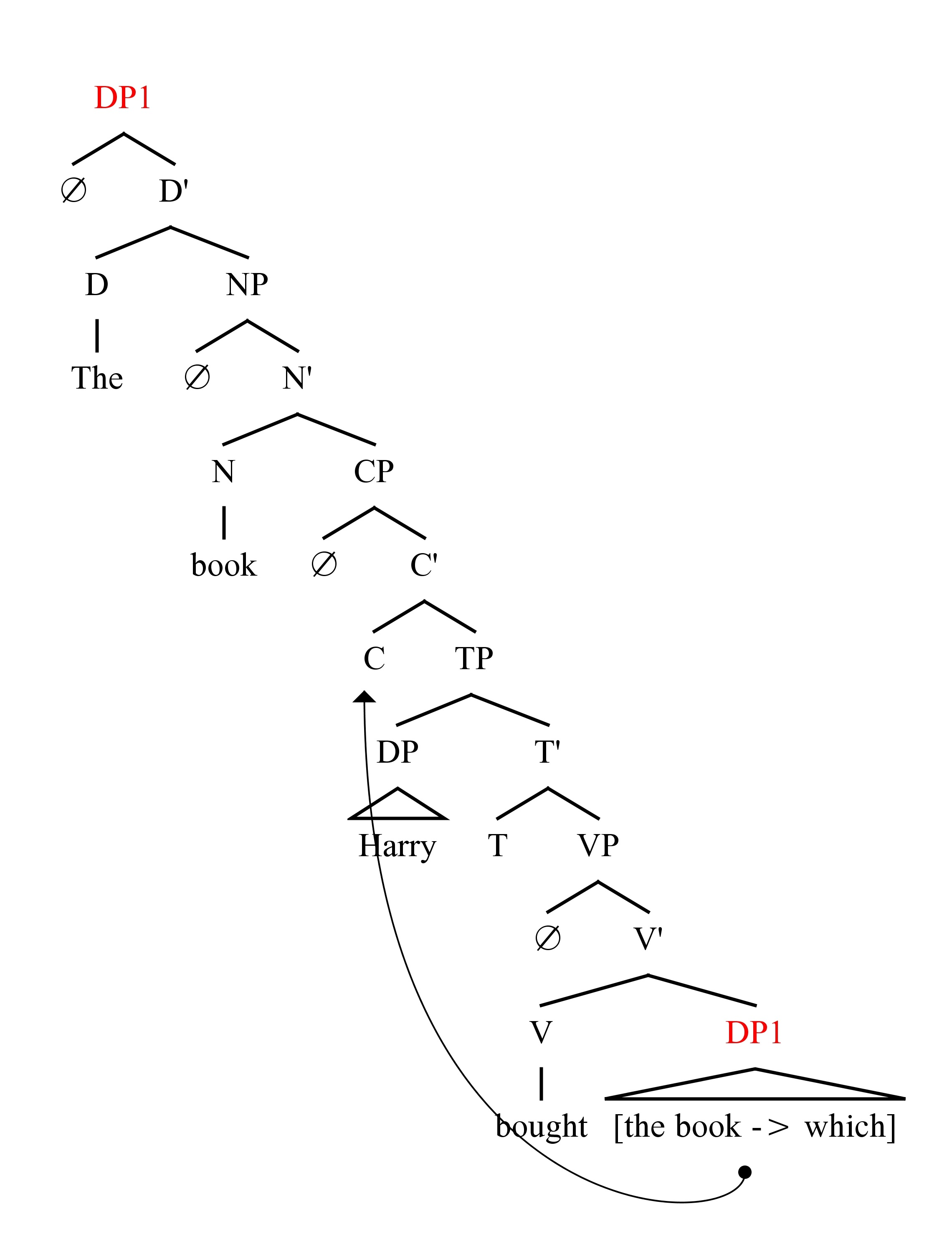
Figure 2: Tree displaying Matching Analysis

=== Ouhallian analysis ===
There are two separate phrasal heads that relativizers can occupy. Cross-linguistically, relativizers may occupy either the head of a complementizer phrase (C-Type Relativizer) or the head of a determiner phrase (D-Type Relativizer). C-Type Relativizers can introduce a relative clause as an argument of a noun phrase, or they can introduce a relative clause as an argument of a verb phrase. D-Type Relativizers may only introduce a relative clause as an argument of a noun phrase. English is a language which uses a C-Type Relativizer, that, as a part of its relativization strategy because "that" can introduce a relative clause as either the argument to a Noun Phrase or the argument to a Complementizer Phrase. The following examples from English shows the same morpheme being used in both syntactic contexts.

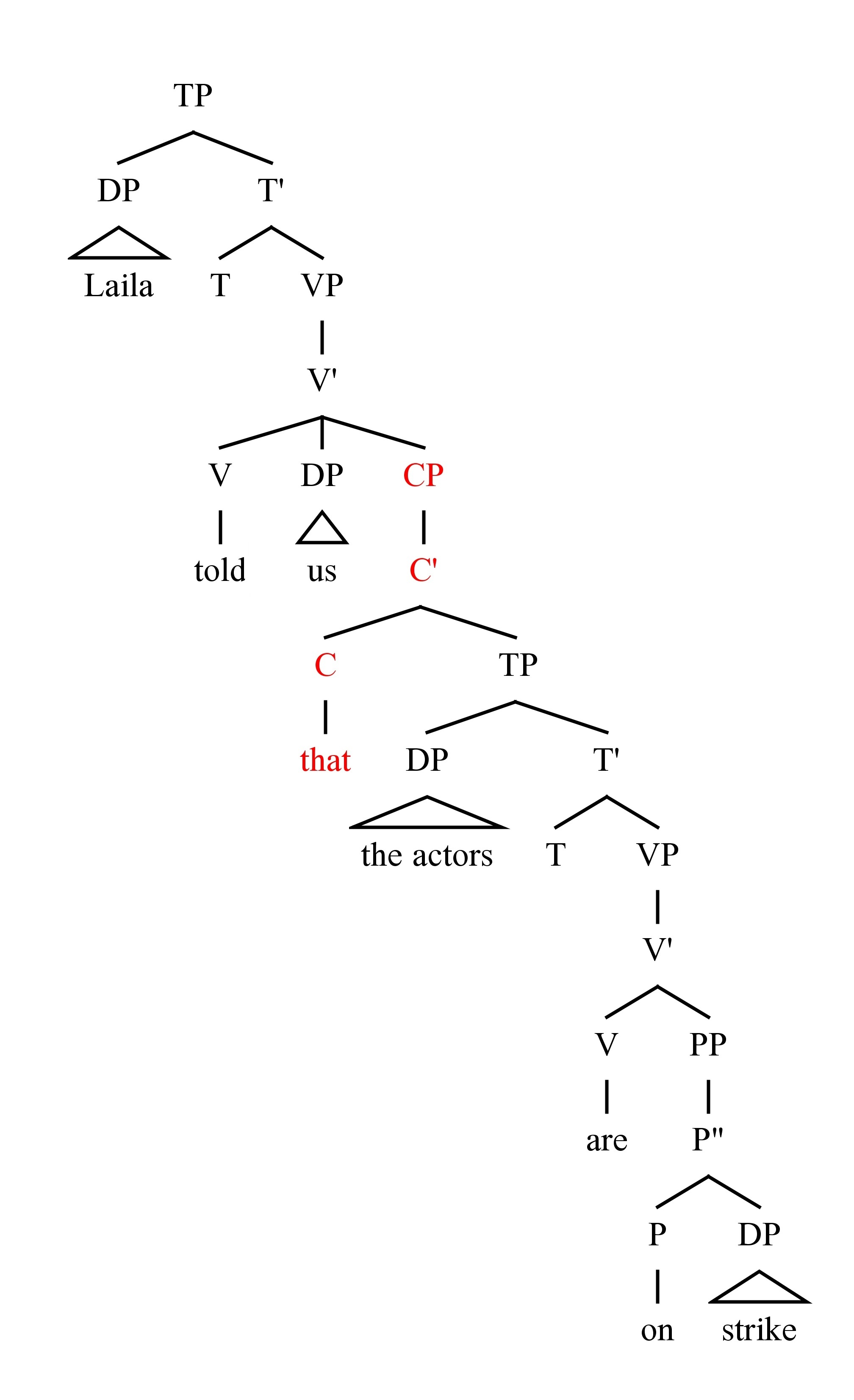
Figure 3: Tree displaying Relativizer as an argument to the Verb Phrase

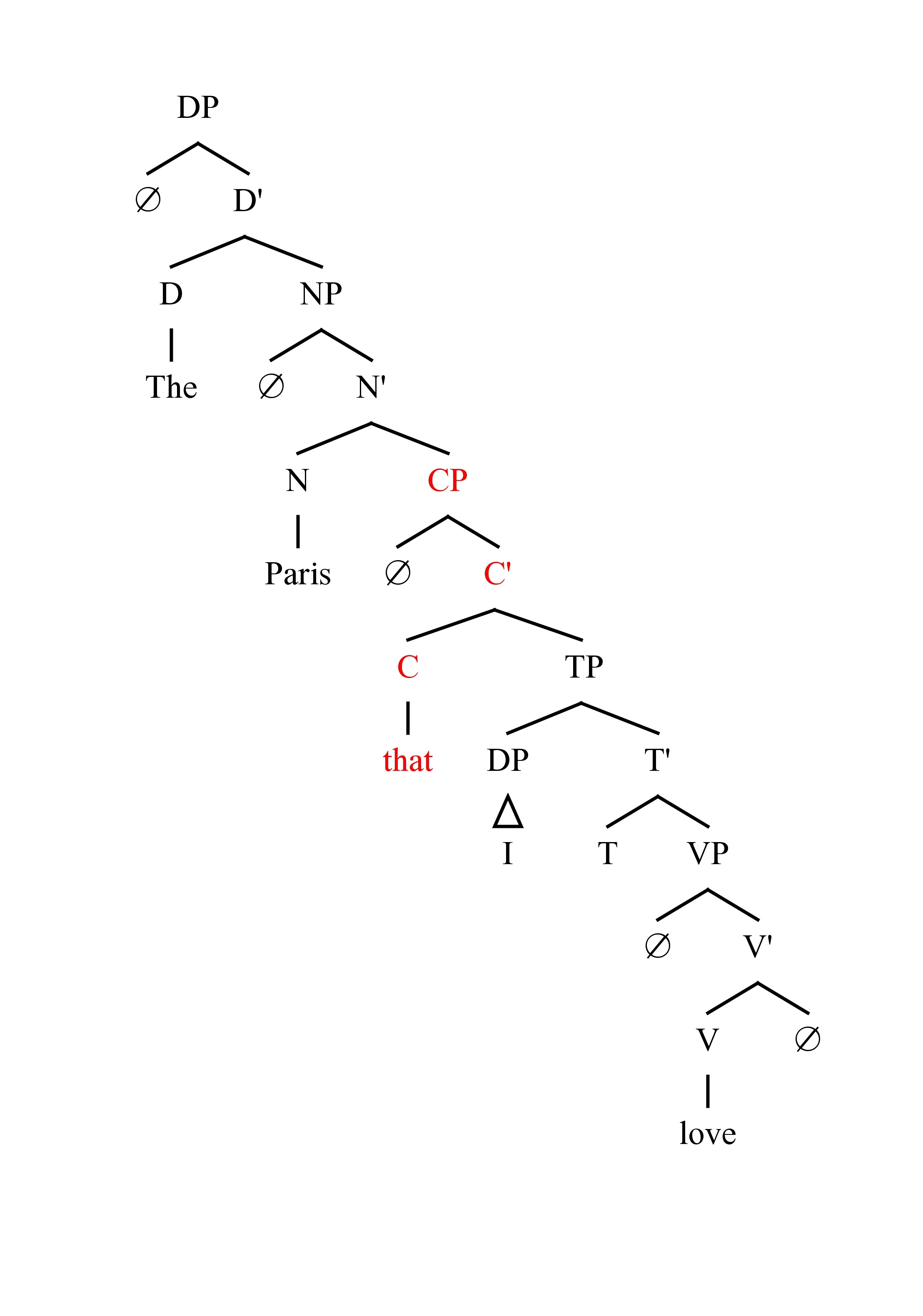
Figure 4: Tree displaying Relativizer as an argument to the Noun Phrase

Conversely, Arabic uses two phonologically distinct morphemes to account for these syntactic phenomena. In the same sentences in a D-Type language like Arabic, each example would employ the use of a different morpheme as shown in examples 1 & 2. In Classical and Standard Arabic, the D-Type relativizer declines according to the gender and number of the noun, but the C-Type does not do so (according to the verb).

paris lli bħibba
Paris REL I.love.it
The Paris that I love

xabbaret-na Laila ʔenno l-mmaslin mʔadrabiin
told-us Laila that the-actors on.strike
Laila told us that the actors are on strike.

== In modern English ==
There are three types of relativizers used in English to introduce relative clauses: zero or null relativizers, wh-relativizers, and the that-relativizer.

=== Comparative distribution of null and overt relativizers ===
Relativizers have been analyzed to be optional in certain languages and are variably omitted in the English language. Such relativizer omission, or use of the null or zero variant of relativizers, does not pattern uniformly in English and has been predicted to be conditioned and constrained by a number of linguistic and social factors. These social factors and the potential influence of age, gender, and education have been minimally explored and seem to exhibit a lesser effect on relativizer omission. Linguistic constraints, such as sentence structure and syntactic position of the relativizer, main clause construction type, lexical specificity of the head NP, type of antecedent, and the adjacency, length, and grammatical subject of the relative clause have been implicated as having more significant influence on the patterning of relativizer omission in Canadian English. The omission of relativizers tends to occur more frequently in conversation than in formal writing.

==== Distribution with subject and object relative clauses ====
The syntactic position or function of the relativizer in the relative clause is a major determiner for the choice of relative marker. The null relativizer variant is more common in object than subject relative clauses.

3) I have friends that are moving in together. (subject)
4) That's one thing that I actually admire very much in my father. (direct object)
5) Everyone's kinda used to the age group [Ø] they work with. (object of preposition)

==== Informational content of the main clause determines distribution ====
There is a preference for null relativizers when a main clause that is informationally light is directly adjacent to the relative clause. For example:

6) It's just kinda something [Ø] I noticed recently.
7) They get values and stuff like that from church that they might not get at home.

In this example, the main clause 'it's just kinda something' provides little semantic information and it is adjacent to the relative clause 'I noticed recently'. As such, it is thought that the main clause and the relative clause are processed together as a unitary processing chunk that is functioning like a single statement, which results in a null relativizer.

==== Distribution with empty head noun phrases ====
Empty head noun phrases, which are not lexically specific and which index generic groups or sets, have been correlated with the use of the null relativizer. Examples of empty noun phrases include words like all, way, time, etc.

8) All [Ø] she wants to do is sleep.
9) She held onto all those jewelry boxes that everybody made for her when we were kids.

Unique head noun phrases, which include superlatives and nouns with the words only and first, also take the null relativizer. For example:

10) That's the only place [Ø] you can go at night.
11) That's the first compliment [Ø] I've got in a long time.
12) That was the worst job [Ø] I ever had.[11]
13) You have a home here that you could rent.

==== Length of the noun phrase determines distribution ====
Longer head noun phrases often co-occur with an overt relativizer, whereas shorter noun phrases are more likely to co-occur with a null relativizer. For example:

14) This pair of suede pants that I got.
15) The weight [Ø] I should be at.

In these examples, the first sentence contains a longer noun phrase ('This pair of suede pants') in comparison to the second sentence, which contains a very short noun phrase ('The weight'). Thus, it is observed that the sentence containing the longer noun phrase also contains the relativizer 'that', whereas the sentence with the shorter noun phrase has a null relativizer.

==== Definiteness of the noun phrase determines distribution ====
Null relativizers have been found to be correlated to the definiteness of the nominal antecedent. For example:

16) I don't think you have the dedicated teacher that I had.
17) And it was a guy [Ø] she worked with for a few years.

The first sentence contains a definite noun phrase, whereas the second sentence contains an indefinite noun phrase which co-occurs with the null relativizer.

==== Distribution with relative clause pronominal subjects ====
When the grammatical subject of a relative clause is a pronoun, it is more likely that the relativizer will be omitted. When the subject of a relative clause is a full noun phrase, the overt relativizer will be retained. For example:

18) I have two cats [Ø] I'd like to turn in to the Humane Society.[2]
19) Do you remember exactly the road [Ø] I'm talking about?[2]
20) That was one of the things [Ø] he did when he was living elsewhere.[11]
21) I always go to my girlfriends 'cause there's stuff that your parents just don't need to know.[11]

=== Distribution of overt English relativizers ===
The overt relativizers of Modern English include the words "which," "what," "when," "where," "who," "whom," and "whose", and these can be referred to within linguistics as "wh-words". These are officially classified as relative pronouns, but can be referred to as "wh-relativizers" in instances where their function is to introduce a relative clause. The other overt relativizer of Modern English is the word "that", which can be referred to as the "that-relativizer" where it introduces a relative clause. There is some debate as to whether to classify it as a relative pronoun like the wh-words, a subordinating conjunction, or a complementizer. The distribution of the different types of English relativizers varies depending on several factors.

==== Fused relative clauses ====
Fused relative clauses, sometimes referred to as "free" relative clauses, are different from most other types of relative clauses in that there is no nominal antecedent to which the relative clause refers. In many cases, the relativizers of English are relative pronouns, meaning that they are in coreference with a noun that precedes them in the sentence. This nominal function is "fused" with the relative clause in free relatives, and this leaves the relativizer without an overt entity to which it can refer. For example:

22) I wonder what inspired them.
23) I wonder whose dog died.

There is no noun preceding the relative clause in these cases, and that is why it is said that this noun's function is "fused" with the relative clause.

==== Grammatical function of the relativized nominal determines relativizer case form ====
Where there are different grammatical case forms of a relativizer, the case form that surfaces will depend on the grammatical function of the noun that appears previously (known as the nominal antecedent) within the relative clause itself. The only examples in Modern English of this phenomenon are the forms "who" and "whom". "Who" surfaces when it refers to a noun that is the subject of the relative clause, and "whom" surfaces when it refers to a noun that is an object of the relative clause. However, speaker judgments vary as to whether it is grammatical for "who" to surface when it is referring to an object of the relative clause. Since, depending on speaker judgments, either only "whom" or both "who and "whom" can grammatically introduce a relative clause referring to an object, there is an "m" in brackets on the end of the relativizer in example (25) below.

- Subject antecedent

24) The person who visited Kim[10]

- Object antecedent

25) The chairman listened to the student who(m) the professor gave a low grade to[12]

==== Animacy of the antecedent determines distribution ====
Only certain relativizers can introduce clauses that refer to human antecedents, and similarly, only certain relativizers can introduce clauses that refer to non-human antecedents. "Who", "whom", and "whose" can only refer to human antecedents, "which", and "what" can only refer to non-human antecedents. "That", however, can refer to both human and non-human antecedents. To exemplify:

- Human antecedent

26) The Pat that I like is a genius
27) The Pat who I like is a genius
28) The only person that I like whose kids Dana is willing to put up with is Pat

- Non-human antecedent

29) Every essay that she's written which I've read is on that pile
30) Every essay which she's written that I've read is on that pile

==== Restrictiveness of the relative clause determines distribution ====
Restrictive relative clauses have semantic properties which make them necessary to prevent the sentence from being ambiguous. They are used in cases where the context that surrounds the sentence is not sufficient for the distinction between the potential nominal antecedents. Both wh-relativizers and the that-relativizer can be used to introduce restrictive relative clauses.

Nonrestrictive relative clauses add extraneous information that is not vital for the listener or reader's understanding of which aforementioned noun is being referenced; or in other words, which noun is the nominal antecedent. Commas mark nonrestrictive relative clauses, and only the wh-relativizers can be used to introduce them. To exemplify:

- Restrictive sentences:

31) He has four sons that became lawyers
32) The soldiers who were brave ran forward

- Nonrestrictive sentences:

33) He has four sons, who became lawyers
34) The soldiers, who were brave, ran forward

==== Finiteness of the relative clause determines distribution ====
In non-finite clauses (clauses in which the verb is left unconjugated), the relativizer appears as an object of preposition, or in other words, directly after a preposition in the sentence. These relative clauses appear to be introduced by the preposition itself, but they are actually introduced by both the preposition and the relativizer, since these two grammatical particles form a "prepositional phrase"; and it is this phrase that introduces the clause. For example:

35) A yard in which to have a party
36) The baker in whom to place your trust
37) A student *who to talk to us just walked in

Note that (37) is ungrammatical because the relativizer introduces a non-finite relative clause, but it is not contained within a propositional phrase.

== In other languages ==
=== Indonesian Teochew ===
Teochew is a Chinese language originating from the Chaoshan region of the eastern Guangdong Province. Indonesian Teochew refers to the Teochew dialect spoken in Indonesia. The most common way to form relative clauses in Indonesian Teochew is to use the relativizer kai. The relative clauses can appear head-finally or head-initially.

==== Jambi Teochew ====
Jambi Teochew is a variety of Indonesian Teochew that is spoken in the province of Jambi on the island of Sumatra. The language requires the use of the relativizer kai to form relative clauses. The relativizer comes from the Chinese language. The relativizer yang is optional and is borrowed from Malay. The relativizer kai always follows the modifying clause. If the optional relativizer yang is used, it precedes the modifying clause, as shown by example 39. If the relativizer kai is not present, the sentence becomes ungrammatical, regardless of whether yang is present or not. This is demonstrated in example 41.

Aling phaʔ kai nongkiǎ khau.
Aling hit REL child cry
'The child that Aling hit cried.'

Yang Aling phaʔ kai nongkiǎ khau.
REL Aling hit REL child cry
'The child that Aling hit cried.'

*Aling phaʔ nongkiǎ khau.
Aling hit child cry
'The child that Aling hit cried.'

*yang Aling phaʔ nongkiǎ khau.
REL Aling hit child cry
'The child that Aling hit cried.'

Another way of forming relative clauses in Jambi Teochew is by using the classifier. The main difference between the kai and classifier relative clause is that there is the presence of a classifier in the classifier relative clause. The classifier in classifier relative clauses can only appear head-initially. The classifier agrees with the head noun type and is in the place of the relativizer kai.

ka Aling kai kau zin tua tsiaʔ.
bite Aling REL dog very big CL.
'The dog that bit Aling is a very big one.'

ka Aling tsiaʔ kau zin tua tsiaʔ.
bite Aling CL dog very big CL.
'The dog that big Aling is a very big one.'

Headless relative clauses do not have a pronounced head. It is the equivalent of "the one" in English. Headless relative clauses are formed with the relativizer kai. The Malay relativizer yang can be used optionally before the modifying clause.

[zazik khau kai] si zi su mui.
yesterday cry REL COP this CL one.
'The one who cried yesterday is this one.'

The relativizer kai is obligatory. In addition, it is not possible to form a headless relative clause with a classifier in the place of the relativizer kai.

zi pung phou si [Aling sia kai].
this CL book COP Aling write REL.
'This book is the one that Aling wrote.'

*zi pung phou si [Aling sia pung].
this CL book COP Aling write CL
'This book is the one that Aling wrote.'

==== Pontianak Teochew ====
Pontianak Teochew is a variety of Indonesian Teochew that is spoken in the capital city of Pontianak in the province of West Kalimantan. The relativizer kai is used to form relative clauses. It is obligatory in head-final relative clauses. If kai is not present in the sentence, the sentence becomes ungrammatical, as is demonstrated by example 48. Pontianak Teochew does not allow the use of the Malay relativizer yang. When the relativizer is present, the sentence becomes ungrammatical, as shown in example 49.

Aling phaʔ kai nongkiǎ khau.
Aling hit REL child cry
'The child that Aling hit cried.'

*Aling phaʔ nongkiǎ khau.
Aling hit child cry
'The child that Aling hit cried.'

*yang Aling phaʔ kai nongkiǎ khau.
REL Aling hit REL child cry
'The child that Aling hit cried.'

=== Ute ===
Ute is a language that belongs to the northern division of the Uto-Aztecan language family that spans the distance from the Rocky Mountains to Popocatepetl, south of Mexico City.

In Ute, relative clauses that modify the subject are introduced in a different manner from those that modify the object. In both cases, there is no overt relativizer morpheme, but nominalization and case morphology introduce relative clauses.

For example, nominalizing suffixes are attached to verbal elements in subject relative clauses.

áapachi 'u [sivaatuchi 'uway paqha-puga-tu]
boy.SU 3s.SU goat.O 3s.O kill-REM-NOM
The boy who killed the goat

In relative clauses that are introduced as arguments to an object, the verbal elements are inflected with nominalizing morphology that is similar to that of their subject relative clause counterparts, and the subject of the embedded clause is inflected with the genitive case.

po'oqwatu 'uru [na'achichi 'uway po'o-na]-y punikya-qha-n
book.O the.O girl.GEN 3s.GEN write-NOM-O see-ANT-1s
I saw the book that the girl is writing

== See also ==
- Content clause
- Relative pronoun

== Bibliography ==
- Bache, Carl; Jakobsen, Leif K. (1980). "On the distribution between restrictive and nonrestrictive relative clauses in modern English". Lingua. 52 (2): 243–267. doi:10.1016/0024-3841(80)90036-4.
- Bohmann, Axel; Schultz, Patrick (2011). "Sacred That and Wicked Which: Prescriptivism and Change in the Use of English Relativizers" (PDF). Texas Linguistics Forum. 54: 88–101.
- Eckman, Fred R.; Bell, Lawrence; Nelson, Diane (1988). "On the generalization of relative clause instruction in the acquisition of English as a second language". Applied Linguistics. 9 (1): 1–20. doi:10.1093/applin/9.1.1.
- Fox, Barbara A.; Thompson, Sandra A. (2007). "Relative Clauses in English conversation: Relativizers, frequency, and the notion of construction" (PDF). Studies in Language. 31 (2): 293–326. doi:10.1075/sl.31.2.03fox. Archived from the original (PDF) on 2021-12-02.
- Givón, T. (2011). Ute Reference Grammar. Culture and Language Use. Vol. 3. John Benjamins. ISBN 978-90-272-0284-0.
- Ihalainen, Ossi (1981). "Promotion vs Matching: Two Competing Transformational Analyses of English Relative Clauses". English Studies. 62 (4): 371–375. doi:10.1080/00138388108598127.
- Johansson, Christine I. (1995). The Relativizers 'Whose' and 'Of Which' in Present-Day English: Description and Theory. Almqvist & Wiksell. ISBN 9789155435011.
- Levey, Stephen; Hill, Carolyn (2013). "Social and Linguistic Constraints on Relativizer Omission in Canadian English". American Speech. 88 (1): 32–62. doi:10.1215/00031283-2322628.
- Liu, Hongyong; Gu, Yang (2011). "Nominalization in Nuosu Yi". In Yap, Foong Ha; Grunow-Hårsta, Karen; Wrona, Janick (eds.). Nominalization in Asian Languages: Diachronic and Typological Perspectives. Typological Studies in Language. Vol. 96. pp. 313–343. ISBN 978-90-272-0677-0.
- Kordić, Snježana (1999). Der Relativsatz im Serbokroatischen [Relative Clauses in Serbo-Croatian]. Studies in Slavic Linguistics (in German). Vol. 10. Munich: Lincom Europa. p. 25. ISBN 3-89586-573-7. OCLC 42422661. OL 2863535W. S2CID 171902446.
- Long, Ralph (1961). The Sentence and its Parts. The University of Chicago Press.
- Ouhalla, Jamal (2004). "Semitic Relatives". Linguistic Inquiry. 35 (2): 288–300. doi:10.1162/002438904323019084. JSTOR 4179275. S2CID 57560961.
- Peng, Annie (2012). Aspects of the Syntax of Indonesian Teochew (PhD dissertation). University of Delaware.
- Sag, Ivan A. (1997). "English relative clause constructions". Journal of Linguistics. 33 (2): 431–483. doi:10.1017/S002222679700652X. JSTOR 4176423. S2CID 7742946.
- Schachter, Paul (1985). "Parts-of-speech systems". In Shopen, Timothy (ed.). Language typology and syntactic description. Vol. I. Cambridge: Cambridge University Press. pp. 3–61.
- van der Auwera, Johan (1985). "Relative That: A Centennial Dispute". Journal of Linguistics. 21 (1): 149–179. doi:10.1017/S0022226700010069. JSTOR 4175767. S2CID 145207479.
