= Classical Nahuatl grammar =

Grammatical features of Classical Nahuatl

The grammar of Classical Nahuatl is agglutinative, head-marking, and makes extensive use of compounding, noun incorporation and derivation. That is, it can add many different prefixes and suffixes to a root until very long words are formed. Very long verbal forms or nouns created by incorporation, and accumulation of prefixes are common in literary works. New words can thus be easily created.

== Orthography used in this article ==
Classical Nahuatl did not possess a standard orthography, meaning that manuscripts provide inconsistent and varied spellings. Two features in particular are marked in this article despite their frequent absence in texts. These are vowel length and the saltillo or glottal stop ([ʔ]). In this article, the saltillo is indicated with an h following a vowel. The grammarian Horacio Carochi (1645) represented saltillo by marking diacritics on the preceding vowel: grave accent on non-final vowels ⟨à, ì, è, ò⟩ and circumflex on final vowels ⟨â, î, ê, ô⟩. Carochi is almost alone among colonial-era grammarians in consistently representing both saltillo and vowel length in transcription, even though they are both essential to a proper understanding of Classical Nahuatl.

== Morphophonology ==
The phonological shapes of Nahuatl morphemes may be altered in particular contexts, depending on the shape of the adjacent morphemes or their position in the word.

=== Assimilation ===
Where a morpheme ending in a consonant is followed by a morpheme beginning in a consonant, one of the two consonants often undergoes assimilation, adopting features of the other consonant.

ch	+	y	→	chch	oquich-(tli) + -yō-(tl) → oquichchōtl man {} -ness {} valor
l	+	tl	→	ll	cal- + -tl → calli house {} ABS {} house
l	+	y	→	ll	cual-(li) + -yō-(tl) → cuallōtl good {} -ness {} goodness
x	+	y	→	xx	mix-(tli) + -yoh → mixxoh cloud {} {covered in} {} cloudy
z	+	y	→	zz	māhuiz-(tli) + -yō-(tl) → māhuizzōtl fear {} -ness {} respect

Almost all doubled consonants in Nahuatl are produced by the assimilation of two different consonants from different morphemes. Doubled consonants within a single morpheme are rare, a notable example being the verb -itta "see", and possibly indicates a fossilized double morpheme.

=== Alternations in syllable-coda position ===
A number of consonants regularly undergo change when resyllabified into the coda position of a syllable due to morphological operations that delete following vowels, such as the preterite of class 2 verbs, and the possessive singular of some nouns. Examples of each alternation are given below, with each form broken into its syllables and the alternating consonants in bold:

- m becomes n which is further devoiced
  - pā-**m**itl "flag" — to-pā**n** "our flag"
  - mo-xī-**m**a "he shaves" — mo-xī**n** "he shaved"
- y devoices to x, or to z when preceded by /s/ (i.e. z or ce, ci) in the same word
  - nā-**y**i "I do — ō-nā**x** "I did"
  - tla-ce-li-**y**a "plants are in bud, spring is arriving" — tla-ce-li**z** "plants were in bud"
- t debuccalizes to h. This alternation does not affect all instances of syllable-final t and is sensitive to stem choice and position in the word.
  - ō-ni-ca**t**-ca "I was" — ni-ca**h** "I am". Here the alternation is mandatory in word-final position, but absent in non-word-final syllable-final position.
  - nic-ma-**t**i "I find out" — ō-nic-ma**h** or ō-nic-ma**t** "I found out" (the former being more common), but ō-tic-ma**t**-queh "we found out". Here likewise the alternation is absent in non-word-final syllable-final position, but is optional in word-final position.
  - ni-tlā-ca-**t**i "I am born" — ō-ni-tlā-ca**t** "I was born". Here the alternation is always absent.

Additionally, syllable-final /kʷ/, spelled uc may sometimes delabialize to c with no conditioning factors, as in the word Totēc, from to-tēuc "our lord".

== Subject marking ==
Every predicate takes an obligatory prefix marking the person and number of its subject, except for the third person that has no prefix, only the plural marker (e.g. tlācatl both means "person" and "she/he is a person"). Both verbal predicates (e.g. 'I sing') and nominal predicates (e.g. 'I am a person') mark their subjects ('I' in the two preceding examples) identically, and nouns bearing subject prefixes can serve as predicates (i.e. 'to be an X') without a copula. (Note: As nouns cannot inflect for tense-aspect-mood like verbs do, the copula cah 'to be' is required for nominal predication outside of the present tense, in which case both the noun and the copula bear subject prefixes.) Both nominal and verbal predicates distinguish two numbers: singular and plural, and the number of a subject prefix must match that of its predicate.

Person	Marker	Verbal predicate	Nominal predicate
1S	n(i)- (Note: The i of n(i)-, t(i)-, and x(i)- is only present when not followed by another vowel. When preceding the third person singular object prefix -c- and the directional prefix -on-, the combinations *nicon-, *ticon-, *xicon- become nocon-, tocon-, xocon- respectively.)	nicuīca 'I sing'	nitlācatl 'I am a person'
2S	t(i)-, (Note: While the prefixes for the pairs (2S-1P), (3S-3P), and (2S optative-2P optative) are identical, the intended subject can always be distinguished by the number of the predicate (e.g. a plural predicate with t(i)- must refer to the first person plural). In traditional texts, however, the glottal stop -h which is often the only marker of the plural (as in the present plural of verbs) is rarely notated consistently, so cases of orthographic ambiguity are common. In the class of verbs which form their preterite singular identically to the present plural, by suffixing -h to the stem, cases of true morphological ambiguity are possible (e.g. titlacuah "we eat" or "you ate", tlacuah "they eat" or "he ate").) x(i)- (Note: The second person singular and plural prefixes take the form x(i)- in the optative mood, which is marked only on verbs.)	ticuīca 'you sing'	titlācatl 'you are a person'
3S	Ø-	cuīca 'he/she/it sings'	tlācatl 'he/she is a person'
1P	t(i)-	ticuīcah 'we sing'	titlācah 'we are people'
2P	am-, (Note: The m of am- assimilates totally to a following s, written az-, and assimilates to the place of articulation of any other following consonant, written an-, and (e.g. anchōcah, azcihuah) and thus only surfaces as m- preceding vowels and the bilabial consonants m and p (e.g. ampēhuah).) x(i)-	ancuīcah 'you sing'	antlācah 'you pl are people'
3P	Ø-	cuīcah 'they sing'	tlācah 'they are people'

== Nouns ==
The noun is inflected for two basic contrasting categories:

- possessedness: non-possessed contrasts with possessed
- number: singular contrasts with plural

Nouns belong to one of two classes: animate or inanimate.

Nominal morphology is mostly suffixing. Some irregular formations exist.

=== Absolutive suffix ===
Nouns in their citation form take a suffix called the absolutive (unrelated to the absolutive case of ergative-absolutive languages). This suffix takes the form -tl after vowels (ā-tl, "water") and -tli after consonants, which assimilates with a final /l/ on the root (tōch-tli, "rabbit", but cal-li, "house"). A smaller class of nouns instead take -in (mich-in, fish), and some have no absolutive suffix (chichi, dog). (Note: A small class of nouns which normally have an overt absolutive suffix may appear without the suffix in the singular when used disparagingly. For example nacaztzatza-tl, "a deaf person", nacaztzatza "a deaf person" (said disparagingly).)

The absolutive suffix is absent when the noun is incorporated into a compound of which it is not the head, for example with the roots tōch, mich, and cal in the following compounds: tōch-cal-li, "rabbit-hole", mich-matla-tl, "fishing net", cal-chīhua, "to build a house". Possessed nouns do not take the absolutive suffix, and instead take a possessive suffix marking their number.

=== Number ===
- The absolutive singular suffix has three basic forms: -tl/tli, -in, and some irregular nouns with no suffix.
- The absolutive plural suffix has three basic forms: -tin, -meh, or a final glottal stop -h. Some plurals are formed also with reduplication of the consonant (if present) and vowel onset of the stem's first syllable, (Note: The nouns ichpōchtli "young woman" and tēlpōchtli "young man" take the plural absolutive suffix -tin and apply reduplication to the element *pōch, which while unattested independently must be separate stem, giving the forms ichpōpōchtin and telpōpōchtin respectively.) and the reduplicated vowel lengthened if not already long, e.g. cuāuh-tli "eagle" — cuācuāuh-tin "eagles".
- In compound nouns, reduplication may apply to the embedded (i.e. first) noun, the head noun, or rarely both, e.g.:
  - tlāca-tecolōtl "sorcerer, demon" — tlātlāca-tecolo-h, not *tlāca-tētecolo-h
  - chiyan-cuāuh-tli "species of bird of prey" — chiyan-cuācuāuh-tin, not *chīchiyan-cuāuh-tin.
  - cin-tēo-tl "maize god (figure) — cīcin-tētēo-h, (also attested as cīcin-tēo-h)

Only animate nouns can take a plural form. These include most animate living beings, but also words like tepētl — tepēmeh ("mountain, mountains"), citlālin — cīcitlāltin ("star, stars"), and some other phenomena. The plural is not totally stable and in many cases several different forms are attested.

Possible forms of the absolutive plural
	-h	-tin	-meh
With reduplication	teōtl, tēteoh	tōchtli, tōtōchtin	Not attested
Without reduplication	cihuātl, cihuah	oquichtli, oquichtin	michin, michmeh

=== Alienable possession ===
Possessed nouns receive a prefix indexing the person and number of the possessor, and a possessive suffix indicating the number of the possessed noun, which may be phonologically null.

	singular	plural
1st person	no-, "my"	to-, "our"
2nd person	mo-, "thy"	amo-, "your"
3rd person	ī-, "his, hers, its"	īn-/īm-, "their"
Unknown possessor	tē-, "their" (somebody's)	

The -o- of the first and second person singular and plural suffixes no-, to-, mo-, amo- is eclipsed by the following vowel of any vowel initial noun, except for short i, which may instead be eclipsed by o. Whether this stem initial short i is considered a "real" vowel which resists eclipsis varies with each noun stem, and some nouns are attested with both possibilities.

Class	Absolutive	Possessed
Full vowel eclipses o	āmol-li, "soap"	n-āmol, "my soap"
o eclipses i	ichpōchtli, "daughter"	no-chpōch, "my daughter"
Both variations attested	izti-tl, "fingernail"	no-zti or n-izti, "my fingernail"

Nouns may also be divided into several classes based on the shape of the singular possessive suffix they take, and any modifications to the noun stem itself when possessed. The plural possessive is comparatively regular, always taking the suffix -huān, and observes the same restriction as the absolutive in that it is only available for animate nouns.

Class	Absolutive	Possessed Singular	Possessed Plural
-in or Ø, Ø	mich-in, "fish"	no-mich-Ø, "my fish"	no-mich-huān, "my fish"
-tli, Ø	cih-tli, "grandmother"	no-cih-Ø, "my grandmother"	no-cih-huān, "my grandmothers"
-tli, -hui	oquich-tli, "husband"	n-oquich-hui, (Note: Note the eclipsis of the possessive prefix's -o- by the vowel of the noun stem.) (Note: This noun is one of a very small class of nouns which may take either the possessive suffix -hui or -Ø.) "my husband"	n-oquich-huān, "my husbands"
-tl, uh	cihuā-tl, "wife"	no-cihuā-uh, "my wife"	no-cihuā-huān, "my wives"
-tl, Ø	ahui-tl, "aunt"	n-ahui-Ø, "my aunt"	n-ahui-huān, "my aunts"
(a)-tl, Ø	nac(a)-tl, "meat"	no-nac-Ø, "my meat"	—N/a
(i)-tl, Ø	com(i)-tl, "pot"	no-con-Ø, (Note: Note the regular phonological change of -m to -n when the underlying final -m of the root is exposed in syllable final position due to the loss of the following short vowel.) "my pot"	—N/a
(a)-tl, -i	cōzc(a)-tl, "jewelry"	no-cōzqu-i, "my jewelry"	no-cōzca-huān, (Note: Here cōzcatl is treated as animate and is thereby eligible to be pluralized as it is frequently used as part of a metaphorical expression paired with quetzalli, "quetzal feathers" with the first person singular possessive, nocōzqui noquetzal, "my precious child".) "my pieces of jewelry"

Possessed nouns may also take subject prefixes, preceding the possessor prefix. Plural subjects require the use of the plural possessive suffix.

an-to-cih-huān
2PL.S-1PL.P-grandmother-PL
'you are our grandmothers'

=== Inalienable possession ===
The suffix -yo — the same suffix as the abstract/collective -yō(tl) — may be added to a possessed noun to indicate that it is a part of its possessor, rather than just being owned by it. For example, both nonac and nonacayo (possessed forms of nacatl) mean "my meat", but nonac may refer to meat that one has to eat, while nonacayo refers to the flesh that makes up one's body. This is known as inalienable, integral or organic possession.

=== Affective nouns ===
Some other categories can be inflected on the noun such as:

Honorific formed with the suffix -tzin.

cihuā -tzin -tli
woman HON ABS
'woman (said with respect)'

== Verbs ==
All verbs are marked with prefixes which agree with their subjects. Classical Nahuatl displays nominative–accusative alignment, and transitive verbs thus take distinct a set of prefixes which mark their objects. Verbs inflect for a number of tense–aspect–mood categories through a series of stem changes and suffixes which agree with the subject in number, and can change their valency through a number of morphological processes, which are also exploited in a system of verbal honorifics.

=== Tense-aspect-mood inflection ===
Verbs inflect for tense-aspect-mood by adding various suffixes to the appropriate verbal base. Base 1 is the normal or citation form of the verb, also known as the imperfective stem, with no special suffixes. Base 2, also known as the perfective stem, is usually shorter in form than base 1, often dropping a final vowel, though formation thereof varies. Base 3, the hypothetical stem, is normally the same as base 1, except for verbs whose stem ends in two vowels, in which case the second vowel is dropped, and the formerly penultimate, now final vowel is lengthened in front of a suffix that does not begin with the glottal stop -h.

==== Stem classes ====
Verbs can be divided into four classes depending on how the stem is modified in the various inflections; most verbs will fall within classes 2 and 3 described below. Important to understanding the behavior of vowel length in the various inflections is the generalization that long vowels are shortened when word-final (i.e. not followed by further suffixes) or before a glottal stop. These vowels' underlying length resurfaces when suffixes are attached. In the following examples, verb stems are cited with their underlying final vowel length, and only in inflected forms is phonetic shortening applied.

Stems ending in -iā or -oā, which are the only verbs which end in two consecutive vowels, are always of class 3. Class 4 comprises only a few commonly used verbs. (Note: The following 8 verbs comprise class 4: tla-cuā, tla-mā, tla-pā, tla-māmā (and its variant tla-mēmē), tla-nāhuā, mo-zōmā, yā) Stems which end in a long vowel with the exception of those in class 4, or in two consonants followed by a vowel, are always of class 1. Stems ending in a single, short vowel, possibly preceded by a single consonant, may belong to either class 1 or 2.

Verbs of class 3 and 4 end in a long vowel, and thus exhibit shortening in some forms, while the final vowel of class 2 verbs is never long, and thus is invariant in length. Here class 1 is divided into two subclasses based on the length of the final vowel, 1-S(hort) and 1-L(ong).

Class	Class 1-S		Class 1-L		Class 2		Class 3		Class 4	
verb base	chōca (cry)		temō (descend)		yōli (live)		choloā (flee)		tlacuā (eat)	
Base 1	base form	chōca-	base form	temō-	base form	yōli-	base form	choloā-	base form	tlacuā-
Base 2	no change	chōca-	no change	temō-	drop vowel	yōl-	replace vowel with -h	choloh-	-h	tlacuah-
Base 3	no change	chōca-	no change	temō-	no change	yōli-	drop vowel, lengthen penult	cholō-	no change	tlacuā-

==== Present ====
The present is formed on base 1, with no suffix in the singular, and -h in the plural, e.g. nicochi 'I am sleeping,' tlahtoah 'they are speaking,' nicchīhua 'I am making it.' A number of common irregular verbs lack a morphological present, instead using the preterite with a present tense meaning.

==== Imperfect ====
The imperfect is formed on base 1, with the suffix -ya in the singular and -yah in the plural, preserving underlying vowel length. It is similar in meaning to the imperfect in the Romance languages, signifying a 'repeated or continuing process in the past', e.g. nicochiya 'I was sleeping,' tlahtoāyah 'they used to speak,' nicchīhuaya 'I was making it.'

==== Quotidian ====
The habitual present, customary present, or quotidian is formed on base 1 with the suffix is -ni in the singular, and -nih in the plural, preserving underlying vowel length. Rather than one specific event this form expresses the subject's tendency or propensity to repeatedly or habitually perform the same action over time, and is most commonly used to nominalize verbs, deriving a noun with the meaning 'one who customarily does ...', e.g. nicochini 'I sleep/am a sleeper,' tlahtoānih 'they speak'/tlahtohqueh 'they are speakers,' nicchīhuani 'I make it/am its maker.' When used nominally, the plural of this form is variable.

==== Preterite ====
The preterite or perfect is formed on base 2 with no suffix in the singular for classes 2, 3, and 4, and the suffix -c for class 1 (Note: Some verbs in set expressions may use the archaic preterite singular suffix -qui, e.g. iz cat-qui 'here it is, behold', iuh-qui 'it is thus'.); the plural is formed on base 2 with the suffix -queh for all classes, without the -c suffix in class 1. It is similar in meaning to the English simple past or present perfect. The preterite is often accompanied by the particle ō-, whose distribution and semantics are elaborated on below. E.g. ōnicoch 'I slept', ōtlatohqueh 'they spoke', ōnicchīuh 'I made it'.

In irregular verbs which lack a morphological present, the preterite is used with a present tense meaning, without the particle ō-. In these verbs, the morphological pluperfect is used to convey both the preterite and pluperfect.

==== Pluperfect ====
The pluperfect is formed on base 2, as in the preterite, with the suffix -ca in the singular and -cah in the plural. It roughly corresponds with the English past perfect, although more precisely it indicates that a particular action or state was in effect in the past but that it has been undone or reversed at the time of speaking. It is frequently accompanied by the particle ō-, e.g. ōnicochca 'I had slept,' ōtlahtohcah 'they had spoken,' ōnicchīuhca 'I had made it.

==== Admonitive ====
The vetitive or admonitive is formed on base 2, identically to the preterite, except for class 1, which attaches -h and not -c to base 2. The plural is formed by attaching -tin or -tih to the singular. (Note: Launey states that the irregular verb cah 'to be' and verbs ending in long ō may not form the admonitive, and instead must use the negative optative, while Andrews notes no such restriction and does provide admonitive forms for all such verbs.) It issues a warning that something may come to pass which the speaker does not desire, and steps should be taken to avoid this (cf. the English conjunction lest). The negative of this mood warns that a non-occurrence of the action is undesirable and is used as a strong imperative. The admonitive is used in conjunction with the particles mā or mā nēn. E.g. mā nicoch 'be careful, lest I sleep', mā tlatohtin 'watch out, they may speak' mā nicchīuh 'don't let me make it'.

==== Future ====
The future is formed on base 3, with the suffix -z in the singular and -zqueh in the plural. In addition to its use as a simple future tense, it can function as a weak imperative in the second person, and may sometimes be translated as 'want to' or 'have to'. It is often used in constructions where the English infinitive would be used. E.g. nicochiz 'I will sleep,' tlahtōzqueh 'they will speak', tiyāz 'you will go, you are to go'.

==== Optative-Imperative ====
The optative-imperative is formed on base 3 with no suffix in the singular, shortening the final vowel, and the suffix -cān in the plural, preserving vowel length. This form uses the special subject prefixes x(i)- in the second person, where it may be called the imperative, and the regular subject prefixes in all other persons, where it may be called the optative. The imperative is used for commands, the optative for wishes or desires, both often in conjunction with the particles mā and tlā. E.g. mā nicchīhua 'may I make it!', xitlahtōcān 'speak! (you pl.)'

==== Past Optative ====
The past optative is formed identically to the quotidian, but uses the optative second person subject prefix xi-. It is used to express a counterfactual situation that the speaker wishes were true but is not, usually in the antecedent of a hypothetical conditional sentence, where the consequent is inflected in the conditional form described below. Example: In tlā tinocnīuh xiyeni, tinēchpalēhuīzquiya 'if only you were my friend, you would help me (but you are not)'.

==== Conditional ====
The conditional, irrealis, or counterfactual is formed on the inflected future singular with the suffix -quiya in the singular and -quiyah in the plural. The basic meaning is that a state or action that was intended or desired did not come to pass. It can be translated as 'would have,' 'almost,' etc. Examples: nicochizquiya 'I would have slept,' tlahtōzquiyah 'they would have spoken,' nicchīhuazquiya 'I would have made it.'

==== Summary of tense-aspect-mood inflection ====
The fully inflected forms for verbs of all stem classes are summarized below, presented in the third person singular and plural in all forms except for the optative moods, which are presented with the second person prefixes. Forms with phonologically conditioned shortening of underlying long base vowels are marked in bold.

	1-S (chōca)		1-L (temō)		2 (yōli)		3 (choloā)		4 (tlacuā)	
Number	Singular	Plural	Singular	Plural	Singular	Plural	Singular	Plural	Singular	Plural
Present	chōca	chōcah	**temo**	**temoh**	yōli	yōlih	**choloa**	**choloah**	**tlacua**	**tlacuah**
Imperfect	chōcaya	chōcayah	temōya	temōyah	yōliya	yōliyah	choloāya	choloāyah	tlacuāya	tlacuāyah
Quotidian	chōcani	chōcanih	temōni	temōnih	yōlini	yōlinih	choloāni	choloānih	tlacuāni	tlacuānih
Preterite	chōcac	chōcaqueh	temōc	temōqueh	yōl	yōlqueh	choloh	cholohqueh	tlacuah	tlacuahqueh
Pluperfect	chōcaca	chōcacah	temōca	temōcah	yōlca	yōlcah	cholohca	cholohcah	tlacuahca	tlacuahcah
Admonitive	chōcah	chōcahtin	temoh	temohtin	yōl	yōltin	choloh	cholohtin	tlacuah	tlacuahtin
Future	chōcaz	chōcazqueh	temōz	temōzqueh	yōliz	yōlizqueh	cholōz	cholōzqueh	tlacuāz	tlacuāzqueh
Past Optative	(xi-)chōcani	(xi-)chōcanih	(xi-)temōni	(xi-)temōnih	(xi-)yōlini	(xi-)yōlinih	(xi-)choloāni	(xi-)choloānih	(xi-)tlacuāni	(xi-)tlacuāni
Optative-Imperative	(xi-)chōca	(xi-)chōcacān	**(xi-)temo**	(xi-)temōcān	(xi-)yōli	(xi-)yōlicān	**(xi-)cholo**	(xi-)cholōcān	**(xi-)tlacua**	(xi-)tlacuācān
Conditional	chōcazquiya	chōcazquiyah	temōzquiya	temōzquiyah	yōlizquiya	yōlizquiyah	cholōzquiya	cholōzquiyah	tlacuāzquiya	tlacuāzquiyah

=== Irregular verbs ===
A number of irregular verbs exist, many of which are very common in the language. Irregular verbs may be either defective, lacking certain inflections, or suppletive, forming their inflectional paradigm with forms from the paradigms of distinct stems, or both suppletive and defective.

==== Defective verbs ====
The most common class of defective verbs are those in which the inflected present is missing, and its meaning is thus expressed by the preterite. The pluperfect in turn replaces the preterite and continues to be used as a pluperfect. In this preterite-as-present use, the particle ō- is not used. Common verbs in this class include cah "to be", on-o-c "to lie spread out, to be in a place, to remain", ihca-c "to stand, to remain", pilca-c "to be hanging", and any verbs derived from this class, which display the same defective behavior. These verbs are otherwise regular.

Huītz "to go" can be analyzed as huī-tz, being composed of the verb huī attached directly to the verb (i)tz, whose simplex form is unattested. It is used here to illustrate the irregular inflection of the small family of verbs including huī-tz, and the two verbs tlatqui-tz and tlahuīca-tz (both meaning "to go along carrying"), which all display the same irregularity. These forms likewise lack a present and use the preterite-as-present, but additionally also lack several common other common forms, which are likewise replaced with the preterite.

==== Suppletive verbs ====
The verbs cah/ye "to be" and yauh/huih "to go" draw their forms from two distinct stems. Cah is used only in the preterite(-as-present) and pluperfect, with ye used in all other forms. Yauh and related forms supply most of the forms of the singular, and huih the plural. Huāllauh is composed of the verb yauh with the directional prefix huāl-, the initial y- of the stem becoming l by regular progressive assimilation.

==== Summary of irregular verbs ====
The inflected forms of the common irregular verbs cah/ye, yauh/huih, huī-tz, and huāllauh are provided below.

	cah		huītz		yauh		huāllauh	
Number	Singular	Plural	Singular	Plural	Singular	Plural	Singular	Plural
Base 1	ye				yā/yauh	yā/huih	huāllauh/huālhuih	
Present	—N/a (Note: The irregular verbs cah and huītz lack a morphological present, the present being expressed with the morphological preterite, and the preterite with the pluperfect.)		—N/a		yauh	huih	huāllauh	huālhuih
Imperfect	yeya	yeyah	—N/a		huiya/yāya (Note: The regular imperfect yāya(h) was considered "less elegant" by ancient grammarians than the irregular huiya(h) and was less commonly used.)	huiyah/yāyah	huālhuiya	huālhuiyah
Quotidian	yeni	yenih	—N/a		yāni	yānih	huāllāni	huāllānih
Base 2	cah		huītz		yah		huāllah	
Preterite	cah	cateh	huītz	huītzeh	yah	yahqueh	huāllah	huāllahqueh
Pluperfect	catca	catcah	huītza	huītzah	yahca	yahcah	huāllahca	huāllahcah
Admonitive	yeh	yehtin	—N/a		yah	yahtin	huāllah	huāllahtin
Base 3	ye				yā		huāllā	
Future	yez	yezqueh	—N/a		yāz	yāzqueh	huāllāz	huāllāzqueh
Optative-Imperative	(xi-)ye	(xi-)yecān	—N/a (Note: Huitz lacks a morphological optative, with the morphological preterite (functioning as present tense) being used in its place, without the typical optative second person subject prefix xi-.)		(xi-)yauh	(xi-)huiān	(xi-)huāllauh	(xi-)huālhuiān
Past Optative	(xi-)yeni	(xi-)yenih	—N/a		(xi-)yāni	(xi-)yāni	(xi-)huāllāni	(xi-)huāllānih
Conditional	yezquiya	yezquiyah	—N/a		yāzquiya	yāzquiyah	huāllāzquiya	huāllāzquiyah

=== Transitivity ===
Verbs are either intransitive, taking only a subject, or transitive, taking both a subject and an object. A small class of ergative verbs are ambitransitive, functioning either transitively or intransitively, as in teci "he grinds (something)", quiteci "he grinds it". Another small class of unaccusative ambitransitive verbs ending in -hua exhibit a regular covariance of class and transitivity, being of class 1 when used intransitively, and class 2 transitively, i.e. ōnichipāhuac "I became clean", ōnicchipāuh "I cleaned it".

=== Transitive object marking ===
Transitive and bitransitive verbs take a distinct set of prefixes, after subject marking, but before the stem, to mark their objects. Verbs may mark multiple objects simultaneously, subject to some restrictions.

1, 2, 3, S, P refer to the first, second, and third person in the singular and plural. Third person objects may be either animate (e.g. 'him') or inanimate (e.g. 'it'). R marks a reflexive object, the subject acting upon itself; or a reciprocal object, multiple entities acting on each other. Reflexive and reciprocal objects can only be used with subject marking of the same person and number, e.g. nino- 'I do to myself', mo 'it does to itself, they do to each other, etc.' These are the referential objects, which have also been termed specific or definite. The constituent cross-referenced by a referential pronoun may, however, potentially be neither semantically specific nor definite in some instances, e.g. nicchīhuaz in tleh in ticnequiz 'I shall do whatever you want', ahmō itlah molcāhuaz 'nothing is forgotten'.

The nonreferential object pronouns, marked N-, signal that the object of the verb cannot cross-reference and thereby agree in person and number marking with another coreferential constituent in the clause if one exists, an otherwise obligatory (Note: There are rare cases in which a referential prefix and its coreferential constituent appear to not agree in person and number.) and pervasive feature of Classical Nahuatl syntax. The nonreferential pronouns mark the object as general, nonspecific people or things. The nonreferential objects have thus commonly been termed nonspecific or indefinite. Nonreferential objects may be human marked H, non-human marked NH, or reflexive.

	S	P
1	-nēch- 'me'	-tēch- 'us'
2	-mitz- 'you SG'	-amēch- 'you PL'
3	-c-, -qui- (Note: This prefix gains the anaptyctic vowel i and takes the form -qui- if and only if the form -c- would create an illegal cluster, e.g. quicua not *ccua, but niccua not *niquicua. The particle ō-, however, does not prevent the use of the -qui- form, e.g. ōquicuah. Note also that the c variant of the prefix is subject to regular spelling alternations before the vowels e and i, being spelled -qu-.) 'he, she, it'	-(qu)im- (Note: As with the prefix -am-, this prefix only surfaces with final -m before vowels and the bilabial consonants m and p.) 'them'
1-R	-no- (Note: As with the possessive prefixes, these prefixes are always eclipsed by vowels other than short i. However, they eclipse i in verbs beginning in iCC, e.g. ilpia — molpia, except for verbs beginning in ihC, e.g. ihtōtia — mihtōtia.) 'myself'	-to- 'ourselves, each other'
2/3-R	-mo- 'your/him/her/itself, your/themselves, each other'	
N-H	-tē- (Note: This prefix never eclipses following vowels, e.g. tēilhuia.) 'someone, people'	
N-NH	-tla- (Note: This prefix does not eclipse following vowels resulting in vowel hiatus, e.g. tlaī, except for short i, which it always eclipses, e.g. tlalpia.) 'something, things'	
N-R	-ne- (Note: This prefix does not eclipse following vowels, resulting in vowel hiatus, e.g. neānalo, except short e or long ē and short i, which display variation in form even in the same verb, e.g. neēhualo or nēhualo and neittalo or nettalo.) 'oneself, each other'	

==== Distribution and order of object prefixes ====
Transitive verbs must always take an object prefix, whether referential or non-referential, if the object is unknown or unspecified. A number of inherently bitransitive verbs such as maca 'to give', and verbs with additional causative and applicative objects can have more than one object, but verbs may only index one non-reflexive referential object though the object prefixes, i.e. ni-mitz-tla-maca 'I give you something', ni-c-tē-maca 'I give it to people', but not *ni-mitz-qui-maca 'I give you it'. The only exception to this prohibition against multiple non-reflexive referential object prefixes is the case where a non-third person object and a third person plural object are both indexed, with the third person plural prefix taking the shape -im-. There is no restriction against the co-occurrence of a referential and non-referential prefix, or multiple non-referential prefixes, as in some derived causatives or applicatives.

The prefixes occur in the following fixed order:

1. referential object
2. reduced third person plural object
3. referential reflexive
4. non-referential human
5. non-referential non-human

The prefix -ne- only appears in reflexive verbs in the impersonal, causative, and applicative, to be described below, and some nominalizations. Its placement is more complex and less fixed.

o=ti-nēch-im-maca-c
ANT=2SG.S-1SG.O-3PL.O-give-PRET:SG
'You gave them (e.g. turkeys) to me'

ni-c-tla-caquī-tia-Ø
1SG.S-3SG.O-NREF.H.O-hear-CAUS-PRES:SG
'I cause him to hear something'

ti-c-to-maca-h xōchi-tl
1PL.S-3SG.O-1PL.R-give-PRES:PL flower-SG
'We give each other flowers'

ti-tē-tla-pāca-ltia-Ø
2SG.S-NREF.H.O-NREF.NH.O-wash-CAUS.PRES:SG
'You have someone wash something'

=== Reflexive verbs ===
Any transitive verb may be made reflexive through the use of the reflexive object prefixes; some morphologically transitive verbs, however, are almost always only used reflexively, e.g. zahua in ninozahuaz 'I will fast (abstain from food)', or tlaloa in titotlalohqueh 'we ran'. Other commonly used transitive verbs may be used transitively, but gain new or unexpected meanings when used reflexively, e.g.

- nicnequi 'I want it' — monequi 'it wants itself, it is required'
- nicchīhua 'I make, do it' — mochīhua 'it makes itself, it happens, it becomes'
- anquinnōtzazqueh 'you (pl) will summon them' — monōtzazqueh 'they will converse with themselves deliberate, reflect'.

Another common use of the reflexive is with a connotation like that of the passive, wherein an event is presented as happening spontaneously through a participant's acting on itself, backgrounding the true agent of the verb where it may not be salient, e.g.

- mocua 'it eats itself — it is eaten'
- mihtoāya 'it used to say itself — it was said'
- titotolīniah 'we afflict, mistreat ourselves — we are poor, we suffer'

=== Valency-changing operations ===
The number of arguments a verb takes is referred to as its valency. Verbs can be impersonal, with 0 arguments, e.g. cepayahui 'it snows'; intransitive, with 1 argument, a subject, e.g. ni-chōca 'I cry'; monotransitive, with 2 arguments, a subject and on object, e.g. ni-mitz-itta 'I see you'; or bitransitive, with 3 arguments, a subject and 2 objects, e.g. ni-mitz-tla-maca 'I give something to you'.

Classical Nahuatl verbs may change their valency through a number of morphological processes, decreasing it through impersonalization or passivization, or increasing it through the addition of causative or applicative objects.

==== Impersonal tla- ====
Some intransitive verbs with inanimate subjects may take the prefix tla- deriving an impersonal verb referring to a generalized, often natural phenomenon, e.g.

- huāqui 'it dries up' — tla-huāqui 'there is a drought'
- celiya 'it becomes green' — tla-celiya 'everything (e.g. plants) becomes green'
- nēci 'it becomes visible, appears' — tla-nēci 'everything becomes visible, appears — dawn breaks'

In a limited number of cases, an already impersonal verb may be redundantly impersonalized, or the source intransitive verb may have an animate subject, e.g.

- yohua 'night approaches' — tla-yohua 'night approaches'
- cuecuechca 'he trembles' — tla-cuecuechca 'there is trembling'

==== Base 4 nonactive stem ====
More common and productive than the tla- impersonal is a process by which verbs are impersonalized or passivized through stem change. The shape a verb takes in these forms is known as the nonactive stem or base 4. Its form is somewhat unpredictable, with some verbs having multiple attested forms, but it is generally derived by adding to the (base 1) imperfective stem one of the simple endings -ō, -lō or -hua, or one of the combinations -o-hua, -lo-hua or -hua-lō, e.g.

- tequi 'to cut' — tec-ō 'to be cut'
- cochi 'to sleep' — cochī-hua 'one sleeps'
- quetza 'to erect' — quetza-lō 'to be erected'

The rules governing the suffix added to a verb stem involve both its phonological shape and transitivity. The variants in -hua are most common for intransitive verbs, and -lō for transitive ones, whereas -lo-hua is suffixed only to a small number of irregular verbs. The stem final vowel may be lengthened, as with cochi — cochī-hua, and stem final z/c(e,i), t, tz may be palatalized to x, ch, ch respectively, e.g.

- ahci 'to arrive' — ahxī-hua 'one arrives'
- mati 'to know' — mach-ō 'to be known'
- huetzi 'to fall' — huech-ō-hua 'one falls'

In the case of the irregular compound verbs huī-tz 'come', and tla-(i)tqui-tz and tla-huīca-tz both meaning 'bring something' -lo-hua is suffixed to the embedded verb, i.e. before -tz.

- huī-tz — huī-lo-hua-tz
- tla-tqui-tz — itqui-lo-hua-tz
- tla-huīca-tz — huīca-lo-hua-tz

The nonactive stem of cah 'to be' is yelohua.

==== Impersonal ====
Both intransitive and transitive verbs may be impersonalized through the use of the nonactive stem, deriving a verb with the meaning 'one does', 'people do' or sometimes 'everyone does'. Impersonal verbs take no subject agreement prefixes, and always use the singular endings. Intransitive verbs are directly impersonalized by the use of the nonactive stem, while transitive verbs must first fill their object prefix positions with the appropriate nonreferential prefixes before the use of the nonactive stem, and reflexive verbs take the nonreferential reflexive prefix ne-, e.g.

- ni-cuīca 'I sing' — cuīc-o 'there is singing'
- ni-tla-cui 'I take something' — tla-cuīl-o 'there is taking of things'
- ni-tē-itta 'I see someone' — tē-itta-lo 'there is seeing of people'
- ni-tē-tla-maca 'I give things to people' — tē-tla-mac-o 'there is a giving of things to people'
- ni-no-zahua 'I fast' — ne-zahua-lo 'there is fasting'

==== Passive ====
Only transitive verbs can be passivized. The subject of the transitive verb is discarded, and its object becomes the subject of the passivized verb, which agrees with it in number. The rules governing argument marking are complex in passives of verbs with more than one object, such as inherently bitransitive verbs like tē-tla-maca 'to give' and verbs with additional causative or applicative objects, but it is generally only the animate beneficiary or recipient object which may become the subject of the passivized verb, and additional objects prefixes are only present on the passivized verb if they were also present on active verb (i.e. they are nonreferential, or the 3p-object -quim-), e.g.

- ti-nēch-āna 'you capture me' — n-āno 'I am captured'
- ti-nēch-maca 'you give me it' — ni-maco 'I am given it'
- ti-nēch-tla-maca 'you give me something' — ni-tla-maco 'I am given something'
- ti-nēch-in-cuīlia 'you take them from me' — ni-quin-cuīlīlo 'I am deprived of them, someone takes them from me' (Note: The 3p-object prefix, contracted to -im-/in- after -nēch-, returns to its full form -quim/n- when a preceding object prefix is removed.)

==== Applicative ====
The applicative construction adds an argument to the verb. The role of the added argument can be benefactive, malefactive, indirect object or similar. It is formed by the suffix -lia.

- niquittilia "I see it for him"

==== Causative ====
The causative construction adds an additional object to the verb. The subject of the source becomes an object of the causativized verb, the causee; a new subject is introduced, the causer; and the original object of a transitive source remains an object of the causativized verb, though often only one object is marked because of the prohibition against multiple referential object prefixes.

The formation of the causative is highly variable, and may involve replacement of the stem final vowel with short or long i or ī, palatalization of the final consonant of the stem (whereby c/z, t, tz become x, ch, ch, respectively), the loss of a stem final vowel, the addition of the suffix -l-, a number of minor strategies, or a combination of these strategies, prior to the addition of the causative suffix, which is most commonly -tia, but may also be -lia or -huia in a smaller number of verbs. Many verbs are attested with multiple causatives formed on the different strategies described, and the causative(s) of each verb must be learned individually. Some common verbs and their causatives are:

- nēci "it appears" — nicnēxtia "I cause it to appear" (palatalization, loss of final i, -tia)
- chōca "he cries" — nicchōquiltia "I cause him to cry" (replacement of vowel with i, addition of -l-, -tia)
- tlācati "it is born" — nictlācatilia "I cause it to be born" (-lia)

=== Directional prefixes ===
Two prefixes indicate direction of motion relative to a reference point, usually the speaker but sometimes another point.

- -on- 'motion away'
- -huāl- 'motion towards'

The directional prefixes immediately follow the referential object prefixes and immediately precede the referential reflexive prefixes. When preceding the third person singular object prefix -c- and the directional prefix -on-, the combinations *nicon-, *ticon-, *xicon- become nocon-, tocon-, xocon- respectively.

The prefixes are common on verbs of motion, e.g.

- nonēhua 'I depart from here' — nihuālehua 'I depart from there coming here'
- tonhuih 'we go away' — tihuālhuih 'we come'
- oncholoah 'they flee away' — huālcholoah 'they flee hither'

They may also be used on non-motion verbs with the meaning "go/come and" or "go/come in order to", or to indicate the direction towards which an action is directed, e.g.

- noconitta 'I go there to see it'
- huāllahtoah 'they speak in this direction'

The defective, preterite-as-present verb *o-c 'to be, lie in a place' is always used with the prefix -on- (except when head of a verbal compound), i.e. on-o-c 'it is there'. The irregular verb cah 'to be' in combination with the prefix on- may indicate either location or existence, e.g. oncateh 'they exist, they are (at a location)'.

=== Direction of motion suffixes ===
Two sets of suffixes may be attached to base 3 (the future stem (Note: These forms can occasionally, in texts "not noted for stylistic quality" directly embed the future singular with the z suffix.)) of a verb indicating the direction of motion. These have a more literal directional meaning than the prefixes, and are often translated as "come/go to in order to do" and thus have also been termed purposive suffixes. The inbound or introvert series marks the subject arriving or coming, while the outbound or extrovert marks the subject as leaving or going. Each series only inflects for three forms: the past, the non-past, which can refer either to the present or the future, and the optative.

		Singular	Plural
Introvert	Past	-co	-coh
Introvert	Non-Past	-qīuh (Note: Andrews and Launey disagree as to the length of the vowel in this form. Andrews marks it uniformly long, while Launey notes it as short unlike in the extrovert.)	-qīuhuih
Introvert	Optative	-qui	-quih
Extrovert	Past	-to	-toh
Extrovert	Non-Past	-tīuh	-tīhuih
Extrovert	Optative	-ti	-tih or -tin

=== Verbal compounds ===
Verbs, unlike nouns, generally cannot freely combine. A small class of embedding verbs, however, may form compounds with an embedded verb stem of a shape determined by the embedding or matrix verb. Two major classes of matrix verb exist, those that categorize for an embedded base 2 stem (the perfective stem) followed by the ligature -t(i)-, and those that categorize for a verb inflected in the future singular with no ligature. In both cases, the two verbs form a single compound that shares subject, object, and tense-aspect-mood marking. The valency changing operations, however, which create new stems, may individually target either the embedded stem, the matrix stem, or both in some cases.

Verbal compounds are used to convey a variety of aspectual and modal distinctions in addition to those marked by the usual inflectional paradigm.

==== Perfective embedding verbs ====
These form the largest class of embedding verbs. The perfective stem of the embedded verb is immediately followed by the ligature -t(i)-, whose vowel disappears before vowel-initial matrix verbs such as -oc and -ehua, and then the matrix verb itself. The verb cah 'to be' takes the embedded form ye-, and the verb itta 'to see' the form itz-. (Note: The intransitive counterpart of itta, ithui 'to be seen' takes the same embedding form itz- but is distinguished by its lack of an object prefix. Additionally, there is another intransitive verb itz- 'to be awake', usually found as reduplicated ihitz-.) A non-exhaustive list of common perfective embedding verbs is presented below, separated into the embedded verb and its prefixes, the ligature, and the matrix verb.

Matrix verb	Gloss	Embedding meaning
-cah	'be'	to be doing (progressive), to be in a state (stative)
-oc (Note: This is the same verb as on-o-c without the directional prefix. It is defective, lacking a present tense, using the preterite-as-present and pluperfect-as-preterite, cited here in the preterite.)	'lie spread out'	to remain in a state (stative), to do lying down, spread out
-yauh/-uh (Note: In the present singular, this takes the form -uh. The sequences ti-yā, ti-yah can optionally be elided to tā, tah.)	'go'	to go along doing
-huāllauh	'come'	to come doing
-huītz	'come'	to come doing
-ēhua (Note: As a matrix verb, ēhua may be of either class 1 or 2.)	'depart, rise'	to begin doing, to do quickly, to do and leave
-ihcac	'stand'	to stand doing
-nemi (Note: These verbs generally use the pluperfect in place of the preterite.)	'live, go along'	to continue doing, repeat (iterative), to spend one's time doing
-mani	'spread out'	to happen over a broad spatial expanse
-huetzi	'fall'	to do suddenly
-mo-mana (Note: These are reflexivized transitive verbs which function essentially as intransitive verbs for the purpose of embedding. They always take the reflexive prefix -mo- even in the first person. When embedding transitive verbs, these forms may be used without the reflexive prefix, sharing the transitive object with the embedded verb.)	'spread oneself out'	to enter a state (inchoative)
-mo-tlālia	'seat oneself'	to begin
-mo-tēca	'lay oneself down'	to begin

Ø-tla-cuah-ti-cat-eh
3PL.S-NREF.NH.O-eat-L-be-PRET:PL
'They are eating'

Ø-coch-t-o-queh
3PL.S-sleep-L-lie-PRET:PL
'They lie sleeping'

ni-cuīca-t-ā-z
1SG.S-sing-L-go-FUT:SG
'I will go along singing'

Ø-tōna-ti-uh
3SG.S-make.heat-L-go-PRES:SG
'The sun, the one that goes along making heat'

ti-c-cāhua-t-ēhua-zqueh
1PL.S-3SG.O-leave-L-depart-FUT:PL
'We shall leave it and depart'

Ø-cuepōn-ti-mo-tlālia-Ø in huēi citlāl-in
3SG.S-bloom-L-REFL-seat-PRES:SG IN great star-SG
'The great star begins to bloom, to shine — the morning star becomes visible'

ni-qu-ēhua-ti-tlālia-Ø
1SG.S-3SG.O-raise-L-seat-PRES:SG
'I raise him up into a sitting position'

The stem cac 'to be quiet, abandoned, deserted' only appears embedded in a matrix verb. The stem itz 'to go, head toward' normally only found huī-tz and related verbs is also often found embedded. Embedding may apply recursively, e.g.

Ø-cac-t-ihca-c in ā-l-tēpe-tl
3SG.S-be.abandoned-L-stand-PRET:SG IN water-L-mountain-SG
'The town lies deserted'

Tlacōpam-pa Ø-itz-ti-yah-queh
Tlacōpan-DIR 3PL.S-head.toward-L-go-PRET:PL
'They left in the direction of Tlacōpan (Tacuba)'

iuhqu=in āyahui-tl tlāl-pan Ø-ahci-ti-mo-tēca-t-o-c in miqu-iz-tli
be.like=IN fog-SG earth-LOC 3SG.S-arrive-L-REFL-lay.down-L-lie-PRET:SG IN die-NMLZ-SG
'Death lay spread out like a fog over the earth'

==== Future embedding verbs ====
Two verbs, -nequi and *-quiya, select an embedded verb in the future singular. The verb nequi may be used independently with the meaning 'to need' or 'to want', and when it embeds a future verb, it may mean 'to want to do' or 'to be about to', 'to be on the verge of', e.g.

- niquitta 'I see it' — niquittaznequi 'I wish to see it'
- ye tlamiz 'it will soon end' — ye tlamiznequi in xihuitl 'the year wants to end — the year is about to end'
- tāpīzmiquih 'we are dying of starvation' — tāpīzmiquiznequih 'we are on the verge of dying of starvation'.

The resulting compound verb may be inflected as with any other verb, e.g. niquittaznec 'I wanted to see it'. This construction may only be used to describe the subject wanting itself to perform the action; a periphrastic construction is used when the subject of the desired action and the subject who desires the action to occur are different. A common collocation is the compound quihtōznequi 'it means it, it refers to it' (lit. 'it wants to say it', cf. Spanish quiere decir).

The stem *-quiya never appears without an embedded future verb. When embedding another verb, it forms the construction commonly referred to as the conditional or the counterfactual.

=== Noun Incorporation ===
Noun incorporation is productive in Classical Nahuatl and nouns with a variety of semantic functions can be incorporated. The noun stem is incorporated without its absolutive suffix, directly preceding the verb stem and following any verbal prefixes.

==== Object incorporation ====
Transitive verbs may incorporate a direct object, which must generally be indefinite and nonspecific. The verb thus lowers its valency, transitive verbs becoming intransitive and bitransitive verbs becoming monotransitive, deriving a verb signifying the general 'grouping together of the verb and object [as] a meaningful totality', e.g.

- nicchīhua cactli 'I make shoes' — ni-cac-chīhua 'I shoe-make'
- nictēmaca xōchitl 'I give people flowers' — nitē-xōchi-maca 'I flower-give people, I gift people with flowers'
- nimitztēmolia xōchitl 'I seek flowers for you' — nimitz-xōchi-tēmolia 'I flower-seek for you'

==== Modifying incorporation ====
Verbs of any valence may incorporate a noun with a wide range of semantic functions, leaving its valency unchanged. The incorporated noun may be an instrument, comparison, cause, place, time, or part, e.g.

- ō-tle-huāc 'it became dry by means of fire' from tle-tl 'fire', huāqui 'become dry'
- xōchi-cuepōni in nocuīc 'my song blossoms like a flower' from xōchi-tl 'flower', cuepōni 'blossom'
- n-ā-miqui 'I am thirsty' lit. 'die because of (lack of) water' from ā-tl 'water', miqui 'die'
- ni-cuauh-tlehco 'I climb trees' from cuahu-itl 'tree', tlehco 'ascend'
- mo-cenxiuh-zauhqueh 'they fasted for a year' from cen-xihu-itl 'one year', mo-zahua 'fast'
- ni-mā-cepōhuac 'I become numb at my hand' from no-mā 'my hand', cepōhua 'become numb'

== Relational nouns and locatives ==
As with many languages of the Mesoamerican linguistic area, locative expressions in Classical Nahuatl are often formed with possessed relational nouns, many transparently derived from body part nouns, e.g. n-ihti-c 'inside me' from n-ihti 'my stomach'. Many categories expressed using adpositions or case in other languages (e.g. 'with', 'for', 'because of') are likewise expressed with possessed relational nouns, e.g. no-huān 'with me'. Productive processes exist deriving locative expressions from verbs, and locatives can be incorporated into verb and nominal compounds. Some relational nouns may likewise incorporate noun stems, forming complex locatives, e.g. cal-ihti-c 'inside the house'. Some frequent relational nouns include:

- -huān 'together with, in the company of'
- -pan 'on top of, above, in the time of'
- -ca 'by means of'
- -tech 'on the surface of, concerning, belonging to'
- -pal 'by the grace of, thanks to'
- -huīc 'towards'
- -cpac 'on top of, on the surface of'
- -tlan 'under, beside, near, at'
- -tlah 'area with an abundance of'
- -tēn-co 'at the edge of' lit. 'at the lip/mouth of'
- -yōlloh-co 'in the middle of' lit. 'in the heart of'
- -īx-co 'in front of, in the presence of' lit. 'at the face/eyes of'

The degree to which relational forms may be analyzed as nominal in nature differs, with some transparently derived from nouns and able to appear with the absolutive suffix, e.g. tzālan-tli 'between, area between', and some more ambiguous, having been analyzed variously as nouns with a phonologically null absolutive suffix, or as true locative suffixes, e.g. the ubiquitous form -c(o). Some locatives do not appear to be derived from relational nouns, e.g. nicān 'here', oncān 'there (middle)', ōmpa 'there (distal)'.

Andrews identifies 4 behaviors that a relational noun may display:

1. It may be possessed, e.g. no-pan 'on me, above me'
2. It may embed a noun, optionally possessed, e.g. to-cāl-tzālan 'between our houses'
3. It may embed a noun with the ligature -t(i)-, optionally possessed, e.g. no-cal-ti-tlan 'near my house'
4. It may be further embedded in a nominal compound or a verb, e.g. tlāl-lan-calli 'underground house, cellar'.

Many relational nouns allow more than one behavior.

=== Path-neutrality ===
Classical Nahuatl locatives are path-neutral, that is, they identify that a constituent is a place and not a thing, but not the presence or absence of motion, or its direction relative to the location. As such, a locative may be ambiguous between a source of motion, a goal, or the location of an event, with 'the spatial role of a locative disambiguated by virtue of other clues such as the lexical meaning of the verb, the translocative/cislocative directional prefix attached to the verb stem, the spatial relationship between the speaker and the location which the locative denotes, etc.', e.g.

{in īc} Ø-quim-ihcal-queh Mēxihca-h {in Españoles} {in nicān} Mēxih-co
{IN when} 3PL.S-3PL.O-fight-PRET:PL Mexica-PL {IN Spaniards:PL} {IN here.LOC} Mexico-LOC
'When the Aztecs fought with the Spaniards here in Mexico'

{in ihcuāc} Ø-choloh-queh Mēxih-co
{IN when} 3PL.S-escape-PRET:PL Mexico-LOC
'When they escaped from Mexico'

{in quēn} {in ī-tītlan-huān} Motēuczōma Ø-huāl-mo-cuep-queh {in nicān} Mēxih-co
{IN how} {IN 3SG.P-messenger-PL} Motēuczōma 3PL.S-CISL-REFL-return-PRET:PL {IN here.LOC} Mexico-LOC
'How Motēuczōma's messengers came back here to Mexico'

== Derivational processes ==
There exist a variety of strategies and morphological devices in Classical Nahuatl for deriving words of one part of speech from a stem or inflected word of another. Derivation can apply recursively, potentially creating long and derivationally complex forms. While many derivational devices are highly productive, some derived forms have unpredictable meanings, and some derivational strategies are no longer productive, applying only to a closed set of stems.

=== Derived nouns ===
A common and productive source of derived nouns is the nominalization of verbs. Morphologically verbal forms may be nominalized through reanalysis as a noun, and in many cases a nominalized verb is formally identical to its verb source. Other processes derive fully nominal stems which may participate directly in the full breadth of Classical Nahuatl nominal morphology.

==== Preterite agent ====
Verbs in the preterite may be reanalyzed as agentive nouns, referring to the person or thing that carries out the action, e.g. titlahcuilohqueh 'we wrote things — we are scribes', tēchōctih 'it caused people to cry — it is a lamentable thing'. The nonreferential object prefixes replace the referential ones in transitive verbs. While such forms are frequently formally identical to verbs, singular forms may take the archaic preterite ending -qui, rarely present in non-nominalized verbs, e.g. mauhqui 'he became afraid — he is a coward' (compare ōmauh 'he has become afraid'). Some verbs permit nominalizations with or without the ending -qui with a difference in meaning, forms with -qui generally referring to animate entities, e.g. tēchōctihqui 'he caused people to cry — he is a lamentable person'. Some plural forms may require reduplication of the verb stem as with some nouns, e.g. mīmicqueh 'they are dead people' (compare micqueh 'they died').

When possessed or subject to further compounding, incorporation, or derivation, the nominalized preterite takes a special form sometimes known as the general use-stem, attaching the suffix -cā to the base 2 perfective stem, e.g. totlahcuilohcā-uh 'our scribe', miccā-cuīcatl 'song for the dead'.

==== Nouns of ownership in -eh, -huah, and -yoh ====
The suffixes -eh, -huah, and -yoh attach to nouns, deriving a noun with the meaning 'one who owns ...' from the suffixes -eh and -huah, and 'one who owns abundantly, characteristically, or is covered in ...' from the suffix -yoh, e.g. ninacaceh 'I am an ear-owner — I am prudent' from nacaz-tli 'ears'; āxcāhuah 'one who has property' from āxcā-itl 'property'; tēnyoh 'one who abundantly owns words — famous' from tēn-tli 'lips, mouth, words'. The suffixes -eh and -huah are synonymous variants of one another; consonant-final nouns stems generally select -eh, and vowel-final stems -huah, with some exceptions. The suffix -yoh is subject to progressive assimilation following consonant-final stems, e.g. citlālloh 'starry' from citlāl-in 'star'.

Though almost always translated as nouns, the forms -eh, -huah, and -yoh are in fact verbs in the preterite, nominalized as agentive nouns through the process described above. Traces of their verbal origin can however be seen in their plural formation in -queh, e.g. tinacacehqueh 'we are prudent', their use of the general-use stem when possessed or in compounds as with other nominalized preterite agents, and their ability to be embedded by perfective-embedding verbs, e.g. nicitlāllohtihcac 'I stand covered in, among stars'.

==== -ni active customary agent ====
Verbs in the -ni form, also called the habitual, customary, or quotidian, may function as nouns with the meaning 'one who customarily does ...' or 'one who is given to ...', describing a trait or quality, e.g. nimiquini 'I am given to dying — I am mortal', tlahtoāni 'he customarily speaks — he is speaker for, ruler of an āltepētl', cuīcani 'one who sings — singer'. The referential object prefixes are generally not used with nominalizations of the -ni form, the non-referential object prefixes being used instead. The plural of this form may be in either -h as with verbs, or -meh as with nouns, with a slight difference in nuance, the verbal plural implying a 'characteristic or habit' and the nominal one '[membership in] a group or category of people who have this characteristic'.

The meaning of the -ni form may be similar to that of the preterite agent, and in some cases, the plural is built on the nominalization of the corresponding preterite form, as with tlahtohqueh, the plural of tlahtoāni, or tlahcuilohqueh, the plural of tlahcuiloāni. The -ni agent cannot generally participate in nominal morphology (e.g. being possessed, compounding), and the general-use stem of the corresponding preterite agent must be used instead, e.g. to-tlahtoh-cā-uh 'our speaker'. (Note: Occasionally, this form may be treated as a fully nominal stem, taking an absolutive suffix, e.g. nicuīcani-tl 'I am a singer' (uncommon except in archaic or poetic texts), a possessive suffix, e.g. to-tlamatini-uh 'our wise man', or participating directly in nominal compounds, e.g. cuīcani-tōtōtl 'songbird'.)

==== -ni passive patients and impersonal instruments ====
A passivized verb in the -ni form functions as a noun meaning 'entity capable or worthy of being ...', e.g. īhuani 'it is customarily drunk — potable' from īhua 'it is drunk', passive of ī 'to drink'; tecōni 'it is customarily cut — cuttable' from tecō 'it is cut', passive of tequi 'to cut'.

An impersonalized verb in the -ni form functions as a noun meaning 'instrument by means of which an action is carried out', e.g. tlatecōni '(instrument by means of which) people customarily cut things — cutting tool, knife' from tlatecō 'there is a general cutting of things', impersonal of tequi 'to cut'. These nouns may be possessed, using the active imperfect as the possessive stem, e.g. notlatequiya 'my knife'.

==== Action nominalizations in -(li)z-tli ====
The suffixes -ztli and -liztli attach to verbs, deriving nouns with the meaning 'the action, process, or state of ...', e.g. cochi-ztli 'sleep' from cochi 'to sleep', temō-liztli 'an act of descending, descent' from temō 'to descend'. The variant -ztli is generally only selected by intransitive verbs ending in short -i, though many verbs which select -ztli may also take -liztli, e.g. miquiztli or miquiliztli 'death' from miqui 'to die'. (Note: It may have been the case that formerly, -ztli selected intransitive verbs and -liztli transitive ones, but the -liztli variant was generalized to all verbs by the Classical period.) The suffixes generally attach to base 3 (the future base) of the verb, meaning long vowels are retained, and class 3 verbs lose their final -ā and lengthen the penult. Verbs ending in -ca and -hua may replace the final vowel with i prior to attaching the suffixes, e.g. cuīquiztli 'act of singing' from cuīca 'to sing', and verbs ending in -ci and -ti may palatalize the final consonants to -xi and -chi, e.g. cualnēxiliztli 'beauty, grace' from cualnēci 'to appear beautiful'.

Transitive verbs must use the nonreferential object prefixes, and reflexive verbs use the nonreferential reflexive ne-, e.g. tētlazohtlaliztli 'love, charity, hospitality' from tētlazohtla 'to love someone'; neēhualiztli 'act of rising from bed' from mēhua 'to raise oneself, to rise (from bed)'. Rarely, intransitive or transitive stems (without nonreferential object prefixes) may take -ztli and -liztli, deriving a patient noun with the meaning 'an entity capable or worthy of being ...', e.g. mahuiztli 'someone worthy of fear — someone honored' from mahui 'to feel fear'; chīhualiztli 'something capable of being done — practicable' from chīhua 'to do'.

These forms may participate in nominal compounding or further derivation, and can be possessed, the possessor always referencing the subject of the source verb, e.g. no-tētlahpalōliz 'my action of greeting someone' not 'my action of being greeted'.

==== Patient nominalizations ====
This process derives fully nominal noun stems which take the absolutive suffix -tl(i) and refer to the patient of the source verb. Within this category are strategies which are comparatively less common and productive, and whose derived noun's semantic relation to the source verb can be opaque; alongside a highly productive strategy that derives noun stems with a comparatively regular meaning. The base 4 nonactive or impersonal stem, with or without the suffix -l-, is generally taken as the stem of the derived noun, though some may also be derived from the base 2 preterite stem.

In the first, less common strategy, a monotransitive verb (i.e. one taking only a single object) with no object prefixes, put into the appropriate base, is directly used as a noun stem, e.g.

- titlān-tli 'messenger' from tē-titlāni 'to send someone as a messenger'
- pōhua-l-li 'something counted — twenty' from tla-pōhua 'to count something'
- nāhuatī-l-li 'order, command' from tē- or tla-nāhuatiā 'to order someone, something'

Some intransitive or impersonal verbs may also participate in this strategy, e.g.

- cualān-tli 'anger' from cualāni 'to become angry'
- cepayahui-tl 'snow' from cepayahui 'for snow to fall'

A more regular and productive strategy built on monotransitive verbs attaches the prefix tla- to the appropriate base, even for verbs with animate objects which normally take tē-, e.g.

- tla-cocō-l-li 'injured person' from tē-cocoā 'to injure someone'
- tla-hcuilō-l-li 'writing' from tla-hcuiloā 'to write something'
- tla-pōhua-l-li 'something counted or countable, or a story recounted' from tla-pōhua 'to count or recount something (e.g. a story)'

This strategy is thought to have been highly productive in the Classical period, to the extent that 'there are many patient nouns with [tla-] which appears [sic] in the dictionaries and grammatical texts but are not attested in other contexts, suggesting that the patient nominalization with [tla-] is so powerful that it was easy to fabricate words which were not in use in real conversations or narratives.'

Other, less common strategies include nominalizations of reflexive verbs which take ne-, deriving a noun with an instrumental or process meaning; and verbs which can take both or either an animate and inanimate object, and may be nominalized with either tē- or tla-, with a difference in meaning, (Note: There is some debate on the proper analysis and derivation of this alternation.) e.g.

- ne-zahua-l-li 'a fast' from mo-zahua 'to fast'
- ne-chihchīhua-l-li 'adornment' from mo-chihchīhua 'to adorn oneself'
- tla-machtī-l-li 'a pupil, someone taught' or tē-machtī-l-li 'a lesson, something taught' from tē-tla-machtiā 'to teach someone something'
- tla-nāhuatī-l-li 'someone given an order' or tē-nāhuatī-l-li 'something order, an order' from tē- or tla-nāhuatiā 'to order someone, something'
- -yōtl derives from a noun X a noun with an abstract meaning of "X-hood or X-ness."

=== Derived verbs ===
- -tia derives from noun X a verb with an approximate meaning of "to provide with X " or "to become X."
- -huia derives from noun X a verb with an approximate meaning of "to use X " or "to provide with X."

== Syntax ==
The syntax of Classical Nahuatl is basically predicate-initial while allowing fronting for focalization or topicalization, allows extensive null anaphora, some freedom in the internal ordering of the noun phrase, and features a series of particles preceding the verb in a relatively fixed order which encode distinctions such as tense–aspect–mood and clause type (e.g. declarative, interrogative).

=== Pre-predicate particles ===
These particles cannot stand independently as sentences and must precede a predicate, whether verbal or nominal. A non-exhaustive list of some of the most common pre-predicate particles is given below. Long strings of particles frequently combine in a fixed order, written as single words, and some collocations have fixed and unpredictable meanings.

- ca: Introduces a declarative clause adding force to the assertion. Frequent before nominal predicates where it softens the 'stiffness of a dictionary entry' that a bare nominal predicate without ca has, but less necessary before verbal predicates.
- cuix: Introduces a polar (yes-no) question. Can optionally appear following the question word in content-questions.
- mā: Introduces optative-imperative, admonitive, or future-as-command clauses, obligatory in the 1st- or 3rd-person optative-imperative, optional in the 2nd-person imperative, where its absence gives the air of a 'brusque command'.
- tlā: Introduces the antecedent of conditional clauses in the form in tlā,, or may introduce an optative clause similar to mā but with a heightened sense of politeness.
- at: 'perhaps, maybe'
- quil: 'apparently'. Reports hearsay.
- auh: 'and then, now'. Connects a clause to a preceding one, and is common in narration and myth, where a new clause is rarely introduced without a connecting word.
- zan: Similar to English 'just' in its range of meaning. Softens a following quantifier, meaning 'just a few'.
- ah and ca: Indicate negation. These two particles are in complementary distribution; their distribution is elaborated on below.
- ya/ye: 'already, now, soon'. Signifies that a 'new action/process is taking place as a result of some change'.
- oc: 'again, still, now'. Signifies that an 'action/process continues to be the same, undergoing no change or variation over the period of time in question'.
- nō: 'also, and, same, likewise'. Used to coordinate clauses, or compare two clauses in conjunction with other particles.
- huel: 'truly, very, well, able'. Often translated as 'to be able to' before verbs, especially those in the future.

=== Word order ===
Many possible orders of Subject, Object, and Verb are attested in Classical Nahuatl corpora, and some degree of uncertainty exists regarding its basic word order. Characterizations have differed, stemming from both the differing size of corpora examined and interpretations of marginal patterns.

Launey characterizes the basic, unmarked word order of Classical Nahuatl as Verb-Subject, or more generally Predicate-Subject, in the case of non-verbal predicates. Arguments of predicates are generally preceded by the particle in. With transitive verbs, the unmarked word order is VSO, and either argument may be freely omitted. The object, if indefinite, immediately follows the verb, appearing without the particle in, producing the order VOS, reminiscent of the pattern of pseudo-noun-incorporation in other predicate-initial languages such as Niuean and Chʼol.

Steele reports three generalizations from textual analysis:

1. In transitive clauses with Subject and Object both explicit, the most common orders are SVO and VOS, followed by VSO. (Note: Launey and Steele here disagree as to the status of VSO as basic, and its frequency relative to SVO and VOS.) SOV is marginal.
2. In transitive clauses with only one explicit argument, verb-initial orders are preferred, though the order VO is much more common than OV, while VS is only slightly more common than SV.
3. In intransitive clauses, the order VS is more common.

Hill and Hill characterize the verb-initial orders as basic, analyzing preverbal arguments as 'generally being demonstrably left-dislocated (as evidenced by intonation contours and pauses in modern varieties, and to some degree by punctuation in documents)'.

ca Ø-tzahtzi-Ø {in pil-li}
DECL 3SG.S-shout-PRES:SG {IN child-SG}
{} V S
'The child shouts'

ca Ø-mēxihca-tl {in Pedro}
DECL 3SG.S-Mexica-SG {IN Pedro}
{} PRED S
'Peter is a Mexica'

Ø-qu-itta-Ø {in cihuā-tl} {in cal-li}
3SG.S-3SG.O-see-PRES:SG {IN woman-sg} {IN house-SG}
V S O
'The woman sees the house'

Ø-qui-cua-Ø naca-tl {in cihuā-tl}
3SG.S-3SG.O-eat-PRES:SG meat-SG {IN woman-SG}
V O S
'The woman eats meat'

Some examples of VOS order with definite objects are however noted by Steele, e.g.

Ø-qui-nōtza-Ø {in cozōl-li} {in tīci-tl}
3SG.S-3SG.O-call-PRES:SG {IN cradle-SG} {IN midwife-SG}
V O S
'The midwife addressed the cradle'

Sasaki, citing Launey, provides examples of all three 'very rare' OV orders in transitive clauses, but likewise analyzes these as 'normally the result of some discourse-pragmatic operations such as topicalization.'

auh {in mēxihca-h} Ø-quin-nōtz-Ø {in īn-teō-uh}
and {IN Mexica-PL} 3SG.S-3PL.O-call-PRET:SG {IN 3PL.P-god-SG}
{} O V S
'And the gods of the Mexica called them'

ī-huān {in mich-in} {in tlein} yōl-cā-tzin-tli Ø-qu-itta-Ø Ø-qui-toloa-Ø
3SG.P-with {IN fish-SG} {IN what} live-NMLZ-DIM-SG 3SG.S-3SG.O-see-PRES:SG 3SG.S-3SG.O-swallow-PRES:SG
{} S O {} {} V
'And the fish swallows whatever small animals it sees'

{in ozomah-tli} ī-mā-cpal-Ø {in pōchtēca-h} cencah Ø-qui-temoā-yah Ø-qui-mo-piya-ltiā-yah
{IN monkey-SG} 3SG-hand-seat-SG {IN merchant-PL} very 3SG.S-3SG.O-search-IPFV:PL 3SG.S-3SG.O-REFL-keep-CAUS-IPFV:PL
O {} S {} V {}
'The monkey paw, the merchants eagerly sought for it and kept it for themselves [as a charm for prosperous business]'

==== Topicalization ====
A constituent may appear before the predicate and any pre-predicate particles, topicalizing it, with the remainder of the predicate serving as its comment. The topicalized constituent may be a subject, object, or a possessor of another constituent in the comment. Both subject and object may rarely be topicalized together, producing the surface order SOV, while the order OSV is 'virtually unknown'. Rarely, a topic is not referenced by any constituent in the comment. Regular nouns as well as personal pronouns may both appear as topics, e.g.

{in cihuā-tl} Ø-cochi-Ø
{IN woman-SG } 3SG.S-sleep-PRES:SG
Topic Comment
'As for the woman, she sleeps'

{in cal-li} ni-qu-itta-Ø
{IN house-SG } 1SG.S-3SG.O-see-PRES:SG
Topic Comment
'As for the house, I see it'

{in cihuā-tl} {in cal-li} Ø-qu-itta-Ø
{IN woman-SG} {IN house-SG} 3SG.S-3SG.O-see-PRES:SG
{Topic S} {Topic O} {Comment V}
'As for the woman and the house, she sees it'

{in cihuā-tl} ni-qu-itta-Ø {in ī-cal-Ø}
{IN woman-SG} 1SG.S-3SG.O-see-PRES:SG {IN 3SG.P-house-SG}
Topic Comment {}
'As for the woman, I see her house'

{in ī-pah-yo} ne-hzōtla-lō-z
{IN 3SG.P-cure-INAL} NREF.R-vomit-IMPRS-FUT:SG
Topic Comment
'As for its cure, there is to be vomiting'

==== Focalization ====
Owing to Classical Nahuatl's flexibility in allowing expressions of many types to directly serve as predicates without a copula, or as arguments through the use of the particle in, the semantic roles of predicate and argument may be reversed, focalizing an argument which is presented as new or contrastive information, against the background of the remainder of the sentence. Such constructions have been analyzed as clefts, with the focalized element serving as the predicate, and the cleft clause introduced by the particle in. Subjects, objects, locatives, and constituents of many other semantic types may all be focalized.

ca cihuā-tl {in Ø-tzahtzi-Ø}
DECL woman-SG {IN 3SG.S-shout-PRES:SG}
'It is a woman who is shouting (and not a man)'

ca xōchi-tl {in n-amēch-maca-Ø}
DECL flower-SG {IN 1SG.S-2PL.O-give-PRES:SG}
'It's a flower that I'm giving you PL (and not something else)'

ilhuica-c {in ōmpa} Ø-cat-eh {in cī~citlāl-tin}
sky-LOC {IN where} 3PL.S-be-PRET:PL {IN PL~star-PL}
'In the sky is where the stars are (and not somewhere else)'

cuahu-itl in ic ō=Ø-nēch-cocoh-Ø
wood-SG IN with ANT=3SG.S-1SG.O-hurt-PRET:SG
'It's with a stick that he hurt me (and not something else)'

Definite arguments (i.e. those that would normally be preceded by the particle in) cannot be focalized directly, as the predicate may not be marked with in. Instead, one of the emphatic independent personal pronouns is focalized, e.g. (Note: Several other word orders are possible.)

ca yehhuātl Ø-chōca-Ø {in conē-tl}
DECL 3:SG 3SG.S-cry-PRES:SG {IN child-SG}
'It is the child that is crying (and not someone else)'

ca nehhuātl {in ni-tzahtzi-Ø}
DECL 1:SG {IN 1SG.S-shout-PRES:SG}
'It's me who is shouting (and not someone else)'

=== The particle in ===
The particle in, also called the adjunctor, is one of the most frequent words in the Classical Nahuatl language. Used variously as a kind of definite article, complementizer, subordinator, relativizer, and frequently seen in expressions of time, place, manner, and comparison, its meaning and approximate translation are highly dependent on the context in which it is found, and only some of its uses are covered here.

The prototypical use of in marks an argument of a predicate. In this usage it can frequently be translated as a definite article (e.g. mihtōtia in tēuctli 'the lord dances'), but in may precede proper names (e.g. in Motēuczōmah 'Moctezuma') and possessed nouns (e.g. in nonān 'my mother'), as well as phrases with a generic kind reading, like English 'the' in the phrase 'the tiger is a feline'.

Preceding verbs, in can function as a kind of relativizer, creating a headless relative clause, as in in cuīca 'the one who sings', in mihtōtiah 'those who dance'.

Several words which frequently collocate before in are spelled and pronounced as single words, and in may be felt to be so tightly integrated with the preceding word that the collocation comes to be thought of as a single word.

=== The particle ō- ===
The particle ō-, called either the augment or the antecessive order particle, can be found preceding verb forms with a past meaning indicating that "the action, process, or state reported by the verb-stem has taken place prior to another event" and that "a completed event can have consequences at a later time - in particular, at the moment of speaking." The particle is almost always found with verbs in the preterite or pluperfect in conversation, though may be absent in historical narrative or myth. Less commonly, the particle is also found with verbs in the imperfect, and also the past optative and conditional in the antecedent and consequent respectively of certain types of past conditional clauses.

Though often written as a single word with a following verb, the particle is not a verbal prefix, and does not behave phonologically as part of the verb in that it does not license the use of the -c- allomorph of the 3s-object prefix before another consonant, e.g. ōquipōuh not *ōcpōuh 'he counted it'. Furthermore, certain particles preceding the verb as well as constituents commonly anteposed before the verb may optionally host the particle in its place, e.g.

- the particle huel 'truly, well': huel ōmic — ōhuel mic 'he is truly, completely dead'
- the particle iuh 'just when, right as': in iuh ōonquīz — in ōiuh onquīz 'when it came out'
- an anteposed subject or object: nihīyo ōnicān — ōnihīyo nicān 'I caught my breath'
- an anteposed locative: topan ōcepayauh — ōtopan cepayauh 'it snowed on us'

Although ō- frequently associates with verbs in the preterite, it is never found in nominalizations of the preterite.

=== Emphatic pronouns ===
Classical Nahuatl has three series of emphatic pronouns which are used to focus or emphasize the referent, in decreasing order of emphatic strength: long, reduced, and short.

	Long	Reduced	Short
1S	nehhuātl	nehhua	neh
2S	tehhuātl	tehhua	teh
3S	(y)ehhuātl	(y)ehhua	yeh
1P	tehhuāntin	tehhuān	—N/a (Note: Andrews provides plural forms of the short series: tehmeh 'we', amehmeh 'you PL', yehmeh 'they' but describes them as 'extremely rare'. These are not attested in Launey or Carochi. Launey also does not note the reduced singular forms.)
2p	amehhuāntin	amehhuān	—N/a
3p	(y)ehhuāntin	(y)ehhuān	—N/a

The referent of an independent pronoun is not restricted to the subject of the sentence, but can be used to focus a subject, object, or possessor, as in teh ōticchīuh 'you did it', ca nehhuātl in ōnēchittaqueh 'it was me that they saw', nehhuātl nāxcā 'it is my property'. Independent pronouns are never required except for emphasis as in other pro-drop languages, and do not replace affixal person marking, which is always obligatory. While the full and reduced series can stand independently as the predicate of a clause, as in huel nehhuātl 'it is indeed I', the short series requires a predicate with matching person which it serves to emphasize, e.g.

neh ō=ni-c-chīuh-Ø
1SG ANT=1SG.S-3SG.O-do-PRET:SG
'I did it (as the answer to the question "who did it?")'

cuix tehhuātl
YNQ 2:SG
'Is it you? are you the one?'

=== Indeterminate pronouns and quantifiers ===
Classical Nahuatl possesses a series of indeterminate pronouns whose meaning varies with the context in which they are used, from interrogative ('where?'), relative ('the place where'), existential ('somewhere'), negative existential ('nowhere'), to free-choice indefinite ('wherever').

Indeterminate pronouns
Basic form	Interrogative reading
āc	'who?'
tleh	'what?'
cān	'where?'
īc	'when?'
quēn	'how? in what manner?'

The pronouns āc, tleh, cān, īc have corresponding existential forms acah 'someone', itlah 'something', canah 'somewhere', icah 'at some time'. (Note: The form quēmah 'yes' may have originated as the existential form of quēn, perhaps originally meaning 'in some way'.) The pronouns acah and itlah may be used either predicatively, e.g. cuix itlah motomin? 'is something your money? — do you have any money?', or as nominal modifiers, e.g. acah tīcitl 'a doctor, some doctor'.

The pronoun tleh is found in some derived expressions, often written as single words, such as tle ic, tle īpampa, and tle īca, all meaning 'why? for what reason? to what end?'. A number of indeterminate pronouns appear to be derived from the same root as quēn, including quēmman 'when (specifically during the day)?', quēzqui 'how many (of something countable)?', quēxquich 'how much?', quēnamihcān 'in what sort of place?'

The indeterminate pronouns are only interrogative when found in sentence initial position. When preceded and followed by the particle in, often written as only two words, the second in written solid with the indeterminate pronoun, they are interpreted as relative or free-choice pronouns, e.g. in tlein 'what(ever)', as in in tlein ticnequiz 'what(ever) you want'. The free-choice reading may be made stronger by adding zā zo 'any … so ever' before the pronoun, e.g. in zā zo āquin tlahtoāz 'whoever shall speak'.

=== Negation ===
Predicate negation is expressed with the proclitic ah-, which may be hosted directly on the predicate, as in ahnicuīca 'I do not sing' or ahnitlācatl 'I am not a human', but is much more commonly hosted on other pre-predicate particles such as oc 'still', ya 'already, yet', huel 'truly, able', producing respectively aoc 'not anymore', aya 'not yet', ahhuel 'unable'. When no such particle exists to host the clitic, it is commonly hosted on the particle mō, as in ahmō 'not', which is frequently present even when such other particles exist, as in aocmō, ayamō, with the same meanings as above. A negated admonitive verb signals a strengthened imperative 'do not fail to...', and always takes the form ah- appended directly to the verb.

Negative quantification is expressed by attaching ah- to the indeterminate pronouns āc 'who(ever)', tleh 'what(ever)', īc 'when(ever)', quēn 'how(ever)', etc., producing respectively ayāc 'no one', ahtleh 'nothing', aīc 'never', ahquēn 'in no way'. Multiple indeterminate pronouns may appear under the scope of negation, where only one negative particle appears, e.g. ayāc tleh 'no one … anything'. When both aspectual or modal particles and indefinite pronouns are negated together, the indefinite usually follows the aspectual or modal, as in aoctleh 'nothing anymore', but not in huel, which appears closer to the predicate, e.g. ahtleh huel 'unable to … anything'.

When preceded by mā or tlā in the optative-imperative or a conditional clause, the negative particle takes the form ca-, whose behavior is otherwise unchanged, e.g. in tlā catleh 'if nothing', mā caīc 'may it never', e.g.

{in tlā} ca-tleh m-āxcā-Ø, ah-huel ti-calaqui-z
{IN if} NEG-what 2SG.P-property-SG, NEG-able 2SG.S-enter-FUT:SG
'If you have nothing, you cannot enter'
lit. 'If your property is nothing, you cannot enter'

ay-āc huel ī-cel cām-pa hui-a
NEG-who able 3SG.P-own where-DIR go-IPFV:SG
'No one could go anywhere alone'

mā nēn ah=ti-c-chīuh-Ø {in ō=ni-mitz-ilhuih-Ø}
IRR ADM NEG=2SG.S-3SG.O-do-ADM:SG {IN ANT=1SG.S-2SG.O-tell-PRET:SG}
'Don't fail to do what I told you'

mā camō xi-tlahto-Ø {in oc} īc ni-tlahtoa-Ø
IRR NEG 2SG.S-speak-OPT:SG {IN still} when 1SG.S-speak-PRES:SG
'Don't talk while I'm talking'

=== Questions ===
==== Polar questions ====
Polar questions are generally marked with the particle cuix, which precedes negation and the aspectual and modal particles, as in cuix ahmō ōtinēchcac "have you not understood me?", but may also be indicated by intonation alone.

==== Content questions ====
Content questions may be formed with an indeterminate pronoun at the beginning of a sentence, optionally followed by the question particle cuix, e.g. cān (cuix) tiyāznequi 'where do you want to go?' Alternatively, the pronoun may be followed by the particles mach, giving the question an air of 'exasperation or amazement', e.g. tlein mach tiquihtoa 'what in the world are you saying?'; or the particle nel 'in truth' 'to express a rhetorical question containing a note of surrender', e.g. tlein nel nicchīhuaz 'what can I even do?'

The indeterminate pronoun may also used predicatively, followed by the particle in in a construction reminiscent of a pseudo-cleft, e.g. tleh in mochīhuaz 'what is it that shall be done — what shall be done?', or āc in cuīca 'who is it who sings? — who sings?'.

==== Embedded questions ====
Both polar questions and content questions, optionally preceded by the particle in and embedded under an appropriate predicate, can form embedded questions. In such constructions, verbs of speaking or saying such as ihtoā 'say' or ilhuiā 'tell' may be translated as 'ask', e.g. ōquihtoh cāmpa ōhuāllahqueh 'he asked where they had come from'. The particle cuix as a polar question marker may be replaced by ahzo 'if, perhaps', e.g. ahmō momati in ahzo huāllāzqueh 'it is not known if they will come'.

=== Relative clauses ===
Relative clauses are externally-headed, and prototypically postnominal and introduced by the particle in. Apart from the gap left by the relativized noun, the relative clause retains all the properties of an independent clause; verbs, in particular, continue to agree with the relativized element. When agreement markers do not unambiguously identify the role of the relativized element, cases of ambiguity are possible, and context must determine which reading is intended, e.g.

in tlāca-h in ō=Ø-nēch-itta-queh
IN person-PL IN ANT=3PL.S-1SG.O-see-PRET:PL
'The people who saw me'
lit. 'The people that they saw me'

in tēuc-tli in ō=Ø-qui-mic-tih-Ø in tlahtoāni
IN lord-SG IN ANT=3SG.S-3SG.O-die-CAUS-PRET:SG IN king:SG
'The lord who killed the king' or 'the lord whom the king killed'

Short relative clauses may appear without the particle in postnominally, or immediately prenominally, e.g.

in cihuā-tl ō=ni-qu-itta-c
IN woman-SG ANT=1SG.S-3SG.O-see-PRET:SG
'The woman I saw'

in Ø-tlācati-z pil-tōn-tli
IN 3SG.S-be.born-FUT:SG child-DIM-SG
'The child who will be born'

Typically, however, long and more complex relative clauses of the types presented below must be of the form noun in relative clause. Possessors, including those of relational nouns, may also be relativized, with the possessed noun in initial position in the relative clause, immediately following in,. Locatives may be relativized with oncān or onpa. e.g.

in xihui-tl in ī-tōcā-Ø cihuā-pah-tli
IN plant-SG IN 3SG.P-name-SG woman-medicine-SG
'The plant whose name is "woman's medicine"'
lit. 'The plant that its name is "woman's medicine"'

in tlāca-h in īn-nāhua-c ni-nemi-Ø
IN person-PL IN 3PL.P-close.by-LOC 1SG.S-live-PRES:SG
'The people with whom I live'
lit. 'The people that with them I live'

in tlecuīl-li […] in oncān nāhu-ilhui-tl ō=Ø-tlatla-c tle-tl
IN hearth-SG {} IN where four-day-SG ANT=3SG.S-burn-PRET:SG fire-SG
'The hearth, […] where the fire burned four days'

in Tlapal-lan in ōmpa Ø-polihui-to
IN red.ink-place IN where 3SG.S-disappear-AND:PRET:SG
'Tlapallan, where he went to disappear'

=== Distribution and analysis of subject marking ===
In addition to the obligatory marking of subjects and objects on predicates, Classical Nahuatl also exhibits a typologically highly uncommon phenomenon whereby the arguments of predicates also bear identical subject markers which agree with coreferential arguments marked on the predicate, even in the 1st- and 2nd-person. Examples taken from (Sasaki, 2012), transcription, glossing and translations slightly adapted.

ni-no-chōqui-lia-Ø {in n-amo-col-Ø} {in n-Āxāyacatl}
1SG.S-1SG.R-cry-APPL-PRES:SG {IN 1SG.S-2PL.P-grandfather:SG} {IN 1SG.S-Āxāyacatl}
'I, your PL ancestor Āxāyacatl, lament'
lit. 'I lament, I who am your PL ancestor, I who am Āxāyacatl'

nicān Ø-amēch-mo-centlāli-lia-Ø Ø-amēch-mo-nechica-lhuia-Ø {in am-ā-huah-queh} {in an-tepē-huah-queh}
here 3SG.S-2PL.O-REFL-gather-APPL-PRES:SG 3SG.S-2PL.O-REFL-assemble-APPL-PRES:SG {IN 2PL.S-water-own-PRET:PL} {IN 2PL.S-mountain-own-PRET:PL}
'Here he HON gathers you PL citizens'
lit. 'Here he HON gathers you PL, he HON assembles you PL, you PL who are owners of the water, you PL who are owners of the mountain (i.e. inhabitants of the city)'

achi huel Ø-iuhqui {in Ø-to-tlahtōl-Ø} {in ti-tlāca-h}
a.bit well 3SG.S-be.like {IN 3SG.S-1PL.P-speech-SG} {IN 1PL.S-human-PL}
'It's almost like our human speech'
lit. 'It's almost like our speech of us humans'

This morphological symmetry between verbs and nouns, and between predicates and arguments, has led Launey and Andrews to propose omnipredicative and omniclausal analyses respectively of Classical Nahuatl syntax, in which every putative argument noun is 'primarily predicative' in nature, and its 'argumental use is derived through the process of cross-reference' in Launey's omnipredicative formulation; Andrews' is even more radical, proposing that 'what have been traditionally called "nouns" and "verbs" are not really nouns and verbs, but word-sized nominal and verbal clauses which obligatorily contain a subject and a predicate within single words'. Under such analyses, 'Classical Nahuatl nouns are pre-formed subject–predicate complexes regardless of their syntactic positions and even non-predicational [...] nouns preserve their predicative structures through the process of subordination.' Launey and Andrews thus analyze even 3rd-person argument nouns with no overt subject prefixes as bearing covert subject marking cross-referenced with the 3rd-person marking of the predicate, e.g.

auh {in yehhuāntin} Ø-Españoles Ø-qui-huāl-lāza-h {in Ø-tepoz-mī-tl} ī-huān {in Ø-tle-quiquiz-tli}
and {IN 3:PL} 3PL.S-Spanish:PL 3PL.S-3SG.O-CISL-throw-PRES:PL {IN 3SG.S-metal-arrow-SG} 3SG.P-with {IN 3SG.S-fire-trumpet-SG}
'And the Spaniards shoot iron bolts and guns'

Sasaki identifies several problems with such analyses:

1. They incorrectly predict the denotation of multi-word figurative expressions (i.e. difrasismos), of which each constituent is independently agreement-marked, to identify the subject with each constituent separately, and not the expression's derived, figurative meaning.
2. The denotation of constructions containing agreement-marked complements of copulae and other resultative expressions cannot be straightforwardly derived from an analysis in which the complement is itself a complete predicative proposition with clausal structure.
3. The denotation of quantificational expressions which may bear agreement-marking (e.g. īxquich 'entire, every', mochi 'all') is quantificational as expected (i.e. 'all of us') and not predicative (i.e. 'we are all').

==== Difrasismos ====
In difrasismos such as cuāuhtli ōcēlōtl 'eagle and jaguar' and cuēitl huīpīlli 'skirt and blouse', each constituent is individually agreement-marked. Sasaki argues omnipredicative and omniclausal models of Classical Nahuatl syntax incorrectly predict expressions such as ticuāuhtli tōcēlōtl should mean 'you are an eagle and you are a jaguar' and not 'you are a warrior'.

nicān ti-cah-Ø {in ti-cuāuh-tli} {in t-ōcēlō-tl} auh iz ye tehhuātl {in ti-cuē-itl} {in ti-huīpīl-li}
here 2SG.S-be-PRET:SG {IN 2SG.S-eagle-SG} {IN 2SG.S-jaguar-SG} and here already 2:SG {IN 2SG.S-skirt-SG} {IN 2SG.S-blouse-SG}
'Here you sg are, you sg eagle and jaguar (i.e. warrior); and here you sg are, you sg skirt and blouse (i.e. woman)'

==== Complements ====
Sasaki notes a class of verbs which are closely associated with an agreement-marked complement with which they appear to form a complex predicate, and which frequently show an alternation in meaning when paired with a complement, e.g. cah 'to exist, to be located at' vs. 'to be (copulative)', chīhua 'to create, to make' vs. 'to cause to become', mo-chīhua 'to occur, to come into being' vs. 'to become'. Sasaki argues an analysis wherein the verb and its agreement-marked complement are both predicates fails to account for either the semantic alternation of the verb, or the fact that the complement lacks an independent truth condition or illocutionary force.

in tlā ō=n-on-mic-Ø tehhuātl ti-n-īxīptlah-Ø ti-ye-z
IN if ANT=1SG.S-TRSL-die-PRET:SG 2:SG 2SG.S-1SG.P-representative-SG 2SG.S-be-FUT:SG
'If I die, you SG will be my successor' not 'you are my successor, you will be'

mā ye iuhqu=in ti-tēcuani ti-mo-chīuh-Ø
IRR already like=IN 2SG.S-beast:SG 2SG.S-REFL-turn.into-ADM:SG
'You are not to become like a beast' not 'you are not to become, you are a beast'

==== Quantificational expressions ====
Quantificational expressions such as 'all of' and 'one of' may bear agreement-marking, but the meaning of such expressions in not predicative. Furthermore, such agreement is optional in some cases, a phenomenon which is difficult to explain under an analysis in which it is the exponent of the subject of a predicate in a language in which subject-marking is otherwise obligatory.

ī-huan {in am-īxquich-tin} {in am-mēxihca-h} {in an-tenochca-h} nicān an-qui-mati-zqueh
3SG.P-with {IN 2PL.S-all-PL} {IN 2PL.S-Mexica-PL} {IN 2PL.S-Tenochca-PL} here 2PL.S-3SG.O-know-FUT:PL
'And here all of you PL Mexica Tenochca will know' not 'you PL are all, you PL are Mexica Tenochca, etc.'

mā ti-cē-meh tehhuāntin ti-hui-ān
IRR 1PL.S-one-PL 1:PL 1PL.S-go-OPT:PL
'Let one of us go' not 'let us go, we are one'

Ø-cē-meh tehhuāntin ti-yā-zqueh
3PL.S-one-PL 1:PL 1PL.S-go-FUT:PL
'One of us will go' not 'It is one, we will go'

=== Non-configurationality ===
Classical Nahuatl can be classified as a non-configurational language, allowing many different kinds of word orders, even splitting noun phrases.

=== Nouns as predicates ===
An important feature of Classical Nahuatl is that any noun can function as a standalone predicate. For example, calli is commonly translated "house" but could also be translated "(it) is a house".

As predicates, nouns can take the verbal subject prefixes (but not tense inflection). Thus, nitēuctli means "I am a lord" with the regular first person singular subject ni- attached to the noun tēuctli "lord". Similarly tinocihuāuh means "you are my wife", with the possessive noun nocihuāuh "my wife" attached to the subject prefix ti- "you" (singular). This construction is also seen in the name Tītlācahuān meaning "we are his slaves", a name for the god Tezcatlipoca.

== Number system ==
20

400

8000

Classical Nahuatl has a vigesimal or base 20 number system.In the pre-Columbian Nahuatl script, the numbers 20, 400 (20^{2}) and 8,000 (20^{3}) were represented by a flag, a feather, and a bag, respectively.

It also makes use of numeral classifiers, similar to languages such as Chinese and Japanese.

=== Basic numbers ===
1	cē	Becomes cem- or cen- when prefixed to another element.
2	ōme	Becomes ōm- or ōn- when prefixed to another element.
3	(y)ē(y)i	Becomes (y)ē- or (y)ēx- when prefixed to another element.
4	nāhui	Becomes nāhu-/nāuh- (i.e. /naːw/) when prefixed to another element.
5	mācuīlli	Derived from māitl "hand".
6	chicuacē	chicua- "5" + cē "1"
7	chicōme	chic- "5" + ōme "2"
8	chicuēyi	chicu- "5" + ēi "3"
9	chiucnāhui	chiuc- "5" + nāhui "4"
10	mahtlāctli	From māitl "hand" + tlāctli "torso".
15	caxtōlli	
20	cēmpōhualli	From cēm- "1" + pōhualli "a count" (from pōhua "to count").
400	cēntzontli	From cēn- "1" + tzontli "hair".
8000	cēnxiquipilli	From cēn- "1" + xiquipilli "bag".

=== Compound numbers ===
Multiples of 20, 400 or 8,000 are formed by replacing cēm- or cēn- with another number. E.g. ōmpōhualli "40" (2×20), mahtlāctzontli "4,000" (10×400), nāuhxiquipilli "32,000" (4×8,000).

The numbers in between those above—11 to 14, 16 to 19, 21 to 39, and so forth—are formed by following the larger number with a smaller number which is to be added to the larger one. The smaller number is prefixed with om- or on-, or in the case of larger units, preceded by īpan "on it" or īhuān "with it". E.g. mahtlāctli oncē "11" (10+1), caxtōlonēyi "18" (15+3), cēmpōhualmahtlāctli omōme "32" (20+10+2); cēntzontli caxtōlpōhualpan nāuhpōhualomōme "782" (1×400+15×20+4×20+2).

mahtlāctli {} oncē
10‍ + 1‍
"11"

=== Classifiers ===
Depending on the objects being counted, Nahuatl may use a classifier or counter word. These include:

- -tetl for small, round objects (literally "rock")
- -pāntli for counting rows
- -tlamantli for foldable or stackable things
- -ōlōtl for roundish or oblong-shaped things (literally "maize cob")

Which classifier a particular object takes is loose and somewhat arbitrary.

=== Ordinal numbers ===
Ordinal numbers (first, second, third, etc.) are formed by preceding the number with ic or inic.
