= Componential analysis =

Analysis of words through semantic features

Componential analysis (feature analysis or contrast analysis) is the analysis of words through structured sets of semantic features, which are given as "present", "absent" or "indifferent with reference to feature". The method thus departs from the principle of compositionality. Componential analysis is a method typical of structural semantics which analyzes the components of a word's meaning. Thus, it reveals the culturally important features by which speakers of the language distinguish different words in a semantic field or domain (Ottenheimer, 2006, p. 20).

== Examples ==
man = [+ MALE], [+ MATURE] or woman = [– MALE], [+ MATURE] or boy = [+ MALE], [– MATURE] or girl = [– MALE] [– MATURE] or child = [+/– MALE] [– MATURE]. In other words, the word girl can have three basic factors (or semantic properties): human, young, and female. Another example, being edible is an important factor by which plants may be distinguished from one another (Ottenheimer, 2006, p. 20). To summarize, one word can have basic underlying meanings that are well established depending on the cultural context. It is crucial to understand these underlying meanings in order to fully understand any language and culture.

== Historical background ==
Structural semantics and the componential analysis were patterned on the phonological methods of the Prague School, which described sounds by determining the absence and presence of features. On one hand, componential analysis gave birth to various models in generative semantics, lexical field theory and transformational grammar. On the other hand, its shortcoming were also visible:

- The discovery procedures for semantic features are not clearly objectifiable.
- Only part of the vocabulary can be described through more or less structured sets of features.
- Metalinguistic features are expressed through language again.
- Features used may not have clear definitions.
- Limited in focus and mechanical in style.

As a consequence, entirely different ways to describe meaning were developed, such as prototype semantics.

== See also ==
- Ethnoscience
- Structural linguistics
- Word-sense disambiguation
