= Feature (linguistics) =

Any characteristic used to classify a phoneme or word

In linguistics, a feature is any characteristic used to classify a phoneme or word. These are often binary or unary conditions which act as constraints in various forms of linguistic analysis.

== In phonology ==
In phonology, segments are categorized into natural classes on the basis of their distinctive features. Each feature is a quality or characteristic of the natural class, such as voice or manner. A unique combination of features defines a phoneme.

Examples of phonemic or distinctive features are: [+/- voice ], [+/- ATR ] (binary features) and [ CORONAL ] (a unary feature; also a place feature).

Surface representations can be expressed as the result of rules acting on the features of the underlying representation. These rules are formulated in terms of transformations on features.

== In morphology and syntax ==
In morphology and syntax, words are often organized into lexical categories or word classes, such as "noun", "verb", "adjective", and so on. These word classes have grammatical features (also called categories or inflectional categories), which can have one of a set of potential values (also called the property, meaning, or feature of the category).

For example, consider the pronoun in English. Pronouns are a lexical category. Pronouns have the person feature, which can have a value of "first", "second", or "third". English pronouns also have the number feature, which can have a value of either "singular" or "plural". As a result, we can describe the English pronoun "they" as a pronoun with [person:3] and [number:plural]. Third person singular pronouns in English also have a gender feature: "she" is [gender:feminine], "he" [gender:masculine], and "it" or "they" [gender:neuter].

Different lexical categories realise or are specified for different grammatical features: for example, verbs in English are specified for tense, aspect and mood features, as well as person and number. The features that a category realises can also differ from language to language.

There is often a correspondence between morphological and syntactic features, in that certain features, such as person, are relevant to both morphology and syntax; these are known as morphosyntactic features. Other types of grammatical features, by contrast, may be relevant to semantics (morphosemantic features), such as tense, aspect and mood, or may only be relevant to morphology (morphological features). Inflectional class (a word's membership of a particular verb class or noun class) is a purely morphological feature, because it is only relevant to the morphological realisation of the word.

In formal models of grammar, features can be represented as attribute-value pairs. For example, in Lexical functional grammar, syntactic features are represented alongside grammatical functions at the level of functional structure (f-structure), which takes the form of an attribute-value matrix.

== In semantics ==
In semantics, words are categorized into semantic classes. Intersecting semantic classes share the same semantic features. Semantic features can include [±human] and [±animate]. These features may in some instances be realised morphologically, in which case they may also be called morphosemantic features.

== See also ==
- Areal feature
- Distinctive feature
- Featural writing system
- Markedness
- Semantic feature
