= Structural semantics =

Linguistic school of thought

Structural semantics (also structuralist semantics) is a linguistic school and paradigm that emerged in Europe from the 1930s, inspired by the structuralist linguistic movement started by Ferdinand de Saussure's 1916 work "Cours De Linguistique Generale" (A Course in General Linguistics).

Examples of approaches within structural semantics are Lexical field theory (1931-1960s), relational semantics (from the 1960s by John Lyons) and componential analysis (from the 1960s by Eugenio Coseriu, Bernard Pottier and Algirdas Greimas). From the 1960s these approaches were incorporated into generative linguistics. Other prominent developer of structural semantics have been Louis Hjelmslev, Émile Benveniste, Klaus Heger, Kurt Baldinger and Horst Geckeler.

Logical positivism asserts that structural semantics is the study of relationships between the meanings of terms within a sentence, and how meaning can be composed from smaller elements. However, some critical theorists suggest that meaning is only divided into smaller structural units via its regulation in concrete social interactions; outside of these interactions, language may become meaningless.

Structural semantics is that branch that marked the modern linguistics movement started by Ferdinand de Saussure at the break of the 20th century in his posthumous discourse titled "Cours De Linguistique Generale" (A Course in General Linguistics). He posits that language is a system of inter-related units and structures and that every unit of language is related to the others within the same system. His position later became the bedding ground for other theories such as componential analysis and relational predicates. Structuralism is a very efficient aspect of Semantics, as it explains the concordance in the meaning of certain words and utterances. The concept of sense relations as a means of semantic interpretation is an offshoot of this theory as well.

Structuralism has revolutionized semantics to its present state, and it also aids to the correct understanding of other aspects of linguistics. The consequential fields of structuralism in linguistics are sense relations (both lexical and sentential) among others.

== See also ==
- Prototype Semantics
- Cognitive Semantics
- Cognitive Linguistics
- Principle of compositionality
- Ferdinand de Saussure
- Algirdas Julien Greimas
