= Locative adverb =

Adverb that refers to a location

A locative adverb is a type of adverb that refers to a location or to a combination of a location and a relation to that location. Generally, a locative adverb is semantically equivalent to a prepositional phrase involving a locative or directional preposition. In English, for example, homeward is a locative adverb, specifying a location "home" and a relation "toward" (in this case a direction), and is equivalent to the phrase "toward home". The relation need not be a direction, as it can be any relation that can be specified by a locational preposition such as to, from, in, at, near, toward, or away from. For example, the word home is itself a locative adverb in a sentence like "I took him home today" or "I found him home today"; in the former case, it is equivalent to the phrase "to home", and in the latter to the phrase "at home".

Pro-form locative adverbs generally form a closed class and are particularly important in a language. Examples in English include there (meaning "at that place"), whither (= "to what place"), and hence (= "from this place"). As can be seen from the examples below, these anaphoric locative adverbs generally have a close relationship with the demonstratives (in English, this and that). They are also usually closely related to locative interrogative adverbs; in English, there is a formal relationship between here, hence, hither; there, thence, thither; and where, whence, whither.

== Usage in English ==
Demonstrative or interrogative	"At" locative (Location)	"From" locative (Origin)	"To" locative (Direction)
What	Where	Whence	Whither
This/these	Here	Hence	Hither
That/those	There	Thence	Thither
Yon (Note: Archaic or obsolete.)	Yond		Yonder

== See also ==
- Pro-form
