= Semantic property =

Aspect of a linguistic unit

Semantic properties or meaning properties are those aspects of a linguistic unit, such as a morpheme, word, or sentence, that contribute to the meaning of that unit. Basic semantic properties include being meaningful or meaningless – for example, whether a given word is part of a language's lexicon with a generally understood meaning; polysemy, having multiple, typically related, meanings; ambiguity, having meanings which aren't necessarily related; and anomaly, where the elements of a unit are semantically incompatible with each other, although possibly grammatically sound. Beyond the expression itself, there are higher-level semantic relations, that describe the relationship between units: these include synonymy, antonymy, and hyponymy.

Besides basic properties of semantics, semantic property is also sometimes used to describe the semantic components of a word, such as man assuming that the referent is human, male, and adult, or female being a common component of girl, woman, and actress. In this sense, semantic properties are used to define the semantic field of a word or set of words.

== Semantic properties of nouns ==
Semantic properties of nouns/entities can be divided into eight classes: specificity, boundedness, animacy, gender, kinship, social status, physical properties, and function.

Physical properties refer to how an entity exists in space. It can include shape, size, and material, for example.

The function class of semantic properties refers to noun class markers that indicate the purpose of an entity or how humans utilize an entity. For example, in the Dyirbal language, the morpheme balam marks each entity in its noun class with the semantic property of edibility, and Burmese encodes the semantic property for the ability to cut or pierce. Encoding the functional property for transportation, housing, and speech are also attested in world languages.

== See also ==
- Semantic class
- Semantic feature
