= Semantic class =

Class of words sharing a semantic feature

A semantic class contains words that share a semantic feature. For example within nouns there are two sub classes, concrete nouns and abstract nouns. The concrete nouns include people, plants, animals, materials and objects while the abstract nouns refer to concepts such as qualities, actions, and processes. According to the nature of the noun, they are categorized into different semantic classes. Semantic classes may intersect. The intersection of female and young can be girl.

== See also ==
- Semantic property
- Categorization
- Semantic field
