= Resyllabification =

Linguistic phenomenon

Resyllabification can be non-phonemic. Notice how the [n] moves from the coda of the first syllable in run to the onset of the second syllable in running. This change does not affect meaning, nor does it occur in all dialects.

In some languages, resyllabification is a phenomenon where consonants become attached to vowels in a syllable different than the one from which they originally came. This can even occur across word boundaries, as happens in the enchaînement of contemporary French-language phonology.

Resyllabification is related to the process of rebracketing.

== English ==
In English, the word apron is an example of historical resyllabification. Originally naperon in French (from nappe, "cloth"), the ⟨n⟩ in the phrase ⟨a napron⟩ shifted across the word boundary to create the modern form ⟨an apron⟩, changing the pronunciation of the word in contexts even without the indefinite article ⟨a⟩ present.
