= Indeterminate pronoun =

An indeterminate pronoun is a pronoun which can show a variety of readings depending on the type of sentence it occurs in. The term "indeterminate pronoun" originates in Kuroda's (1965) thesis and is typically used in reference to wh-indeterminates, which are pronouns which function as an interrogative pronoun in questions, yet come to have additional meanings with other grammatical operators. (Note: The original sense of "indeterminate pronoun" in Kuroda (1965) is distinguishable from how to term is used in the literature following. Kuroda (p. 42-3) held any noun phrase which behaves like a logical variable to be an indeterminate.) For example, in Japanese, dare means 'who' in a constituent question like (1) formed with the question-forming operator no:

dare-ga hashitta no?
who-NOM run.PST Q
'Who ran?'

However, in a statement (2), in combination with the particle ka, dare 'who' acquires an existential 'someone' meaning:

dare-ka-ga hashitta
who-PTCL-NOM run.PST
'Someone ran'

With yet another particle -mo, dare 'who' expresses a universal meaning as in (3):

dare-mo wakaru
who-PTCL understand.PRES
'Everyone understands'

Languages with wh-indeterminates are typologically very common, and this is a characteristic of many language families such as Uralic, Turkic, Dravidian, and the Slavic sub-branch of Indo-European. The syntactic and semantic properties of indeterminate pronouns and their interactions with different grammatical operators is a major topic within the study of the syntax-semantics interface.

== See also ==
- Alternative semantics
- Free choice inference
- Indefinite pronoun
- Wh-movement
