= Semantic field =

Set of words grouped by meaning referring to a specific subject

In linguistics, a semantic field is a related set of words grouped semantically (by meaning) that refers to a specific subject. The term is also used in anthropology, computational semiotics, and technical exegesis.

== Definition and usage ==
Brinton (2000: p. 112) defines "semantic field" or "semantic domain" and relates the linguistic concept to hyponymy:

Related to the concept of hyponymy, but more loosely defined, is the notion of a semantic field or domain. A semantic field denotes a segment of reality symbolized by a set of related words. The words in a semantic field share a common semantic property.

A general and intuitive description is that words in a semantic field are not necessarily synonymous, but are all used to talk about the same general phenomenon. Synonymy requires the sharing of a sememe or seme, but the semantic field is a larger area surrounding those. A meaning of a word is dependent partly on its relation to other words in the same conceptual area. The kinds of semantic fields vary from culture to culture and anthropologists use them to study belief systems and reasoning across cultural groups.

Andersen (1990: p.327) identifies the traditional usage of "semantic field" theory as:

Traditionally, semantic fields have been used for comparing the lexical structure of different languages and different states of the same language.

== History ==
The origin of the field theory of semantics is the lexical field theory introduced by Jost Trier in the 1930s, although according to John Lyons it has historical roots in the ideas of Wilhelm von Humboldt and Johann Gottfried Herder. In the 1960s Stephen Ullmann saw semantic fields as crystallising and perpetuating the values of society. For John Lyons in the 1970s words related in any sense belonged to the same semantic field, and the semantic field was simply a lexical category, which he described as a lexical field. Lyons emphasised the distinction between semantic fields and semantic networks. In the 1980s Eva Kittay developed a semantic field theory of metaphor. This approach is based on the idea that the items in a semantic field have specific relations to other items in the same field, and that a metaphor works by re-ordering the relations of a field by mapping them on to the existing relations of another field. Sue Atkins and Charles J. Fillmore in the 1990s proposed frame semantics as an alternative to semantic field theory.

== Semantic shifts ==
The semantic field of a given word shifts over time. The English word "man" used to mean "human being" exclusively, while today it predominantly means "adult male," but its semantic field still extends in some uses to the generic "human" (see Mannaz).

Overlapping semantic fields are problematic, especially in translation. Words that have multiple meanings (called polysemous words) are often untranslatable, especially with all their connotations. Such words are frequently loaned instead of translated. Examples include "chivalry" (literally "horsemanship", related to "cavalry"), "dharma" (literally, "support"), and "taboo".

== Anthropological discourse ==
Semantic field theory has informed the discourse of Anthropology as Ingold (1996: p. 127) relates:

Semiology is not, of course, the same as semantics. Semiology is based on the idea that signs have meaning in relation to each other, such that a whole society is made up of relationally held meanings. But semantic fields do not stand in relations of opposition to each other, nor do they derive their distinctiveness in this way, nor indeed are they securely bounded at all. Rather, semantic fields are constantly flowing into each other. I may define a field of religion, but it soon becomes that of ethnic identity and then of politics and selfhood, and so on. In the very act of specifying semantic fields, people engage in an act of closure whereby they become conscious of what they have excluded and what they must therefore include.

== See also ==
- Hyponymy
- Metonymy
- Polysemy
- Semantic class
- Thesaurus
