= Specificity (linguistics) =

Semantic feature of noun phrases

In linguistics, specificity is a semantic feature of noun phrases (NPs) that distinguishes between entities/nouns/referents that are unique in a given context and those that are not. Several distinct known factors determine an entity/noun/referent's relative specificity, including:

- Singular terms (e.g. proper names)
- Habituality
- Actual/Nonactual moods
- Factivity
- Negation

Specificity does not rely on existence. This is because specificity relies on the uniqueness of an entity, regardless of whether it may or may not actually exist. For example, “I’m looking for a male sister” refers to no actual entity. However, the ambiguity of its specificity (are you looking for a particular male sister, or any male sister?) is retained.

== Marking specificity ==
In English, the concept of specificity is often denoted by the use of particular adjectives, such as certain. Indefinite noun phrases without these adjectives, like a chair, one coat, or three men, can typically be understood as either specific or non-specific, leaving them unmarked for specificity. However, in some languages, noun phrases in specific positions are unambiguous regarding specificity. This clarity is achieved through case marking, where noun phrases with overt case morphology indicate specificity, and those without it suggest non-specificity. Turkish provides an example of this, as indefinites in the object position are always explicitly specific or non-specific. A noun phrase with the accusative case morpheme -(y)i is necessarily interpreted as specific, as shown in this example:

Ali bir piyano-yu kiralamak istiyor.
Ali one piano-Acc to-rent wants
"Ali wants to rent a certain piano."

Conversely, a noun phrase lacking case morphology is considered non-specific, as demonstrated in this example:

Ali bir piyano kiralamak istiyor.
"Ali wants to rent a (non-specific) piano."

This distinction between specific and non-specific noun phrases is more explicit in languages like Turkish, as opposed to English, where specificity is generally indicated by the presence or absence of certain adjectives.

== Ambiguity in languages with unmarked specificity ==
In English and many other languages, specificity is not typically marked. As a result, sometimes, specificity can be ambiguous. Consider the following example:

- Every woman talked to a student.

This has two interpretations. Under one reading, every woman talked to the same student (the class president, for example), and here the noun phrase a student is specific. Under the second reading, various students were talked to. In this case, a student is non-specific.

"In contrast, in some languages, NPs in certain positions are always unambiguous with respect to specificity. The ambiguity is resolved through case marking: NPs with overt case morphology are specific, NPs without case morphology are nonspecific." Some analytic and isolating languages like Samoan also use explicit specificity markings in nouns despite not having grammatical cases.

== Relationship between specificity and definiteness ==
Specificity and definiteness, while closely linked, are distinct semantic features. The two main nominal codings of definiteness are definite and indefinite. The former leads predominantly to a specific noun phrase. The latter can be either specific or non-specific.

- I'm looking for the manager, Ms Lee. [definite, specific]
- I'm looking for the manager, whoever that may be. [definite, non-specific]
- There's a certain word that I can never remember. [indefinite, specific]
- Think of a word, any word. [indefinite, non-specific]

To make the second example definite and non-specific requires a clarifying extra clause.
