= Definiteness =

Semantic feature of noun phrases in linguistics

In linguistics, definiteness is a semantic feature of noun phrases that distinguishes between referents or senses that are identifiable in a given context (definite noun phrases) and those that are not (indefinite noun phrases). The prototypical definite noun phrase picks out a unique, familiar, specific referent such as the sun or Australia, as opposed to indefinite examples like an idea or some fish.

There is considerable variation in the expression of definiteness across languages, and some languages such as Japanese do not generally mark it, so the same expression can be definite in some contexts and indefinite in others. In other languages, such as English, it is usually marked by the selection of determiner (e.g., the vs. a). Still other languages, such as Danish, mark definiteness morphologically by changing the noun itself (e.g. Danish en mand (a man), manden (the man)).

== Definiteness as a grammatical category ==
There are times when a grammatically marked definite noun phrase is not in fact identifiable. For example, the polar bear's habitat is the arctic does not refer to a unique, familiar, specific bear, in an example of a form–meaning mismatch. "The theoretical distinction between grammatical definiteness and cognitive identifiability has the advantage of enabling us to distinguish between a discrete (grammatical) and a non-discrete (cognitive) category."

== Use in different languages ==
=== English ===
In English, definiteness is usually marked by the selection of determiner. Certain determiners, such as a, an, many, and some, along with numbers (e.g., four items), typically mark a noun phrase as indefinite. Others, including the, that, and genitive noun phrases (e.g., my brother) typically mark the noun phrase as definite.

A number of tests have been proposed to distinguish definite from indefinite noun phrases. "Each has a foundation in intuition, as well as some degree of grammatical effect. However, it is not clear that any of them corresponds cleanly to formal categories."

1. If a noun phrase can be put into an existential clause such as there is <noun phrase> at the door (e.g., there are two wolves at the door), it is likely indefinite.
2. "The concept of identifiability expressed by the definite article is best understood in terms of pre-empting a question with which?"

=== Other languages ===
- In Basque, definiteness is marked by a phrasal clitic article.

emakume
woman
"woman"

emakumea
woman-ART
"the woman"

emakume ederra
woman beautiful-ART
"the beautiful woman"

- In Danish, definiteness is marked morphologically.
- In Romanian:

om
human
"human"

omul
human-ART
"the human"

omul bun
human-ART good
"the good human"

or

bunul om
good-ART human
"the good human"

- In Albanian, definiteness is marked by a noun affix.

djalë
"boy"

vajzë
"girl"

djali
djal-ART
"the boy"

vajza
vajz-ART
"the girl"

djal-i i madh
djal-ART i madh
"the elder son"

vajza e bukur
vajz-ART e bukur
"the pretty girl"

- In Armenian, definiteness is marked with the suffix -ն (-n) or -ը (-ë). Indefiniteness is either unmarked or marked by putting մի (mi) before the noun.

Արև-ը փայլում է:
Arew-ë p'aylum ē
sun-DEF shine.PRS.PTCP be.3SG.PRS
"The sun is shining"

- In Arabic, the definite (الـمَعْرِفَة) can be determined from the indefinite (النَّكِرَة) with presence of the definitive article al- (الـ) or a possessive pronoun suffix forming an iḍāfa construction. Adjectives describing definite nouns are also marked with the definitive article al- (الـ). الكتاب الكبير (al-kitāb al-kabīr) with two instances of al- (DEF-book-DEF-big, literally, "the book the big")
- In Hungarian, verbs show agreement with the definiteness of their object:

olvasok egy könyvet
read-1SG.PRES.INDEF a book-ACC.SG
"I read a book"

versus

olvasom a könyvet
read-1SG.PRES.DEF the book-ACC.SG
"I read the book"

- In Erzya-Mordvin, verbs exhibit definite (objective) conjugation through personal-pronoun-based suffixes (eg. son "he, she, it"), while noun definiteness is marked by suffixes derived from demonstrative pronouns (eg. ťe "this"):

mon lovnan kińiga
I read-1SG.PRES.INDEF book-ACC.SG.INDEF
"I read a book"

versus

mon lovnasa kińigańť
I read-1SG.PRES.DEF book-ACC.SG.DEF
"I read the book"

- In Japanese, 私は本を持っている (watashi wa hon o motteiru "I have a/the book") is ambiguous between definite and indefinite readings.

Germanic, Romance, Celtic, Semitic, and auxiliary languages generally have a definite article, often preposed but in some cases postposed. For example, Hebrew prefixes the letter he, while Aramaic suffixes the letter aleph. Many other languages do not. Some examples are Chinese, Japanese, Finnish, and modern Slavic languages except Bulgarian and Macedonian. When necessary, languages of this kind may indicate definiteness by other means such as demonstratives.

In most languages, definiteness is marked only on common nouns, since proper nouns are already considered inherently definite. However, Biblical Hebrew shows exceptions where the definite article can be prefixed to proper nouns. This demonstrates that, unlike in most languages, Biblical Hebrew may apply overt definiteness even to proper names, possibly for emphasis or specificity.

It is common for definiteness to interact with the marking of case in certain syntactic contexts. In many languages, a direct object receives distinctive marking only if it is definite. For example, in Turkish, the direct object in the sentence adamı gördüm (meaning "I saw the man") is marked with the suffix -ı (indicating definiteness). The absence of the suffix on a direct object in Turkish means that it is indefinite and, in the absence of the indefinite article bir, no longer explicitly singular: adam gördüm ("I saw a man/I saw men").

In Serbo-Croatian, in the Baltic languages Latvian and Lithuanian, and, to a lesser extent in Slovene, definiteness can be expressed morphologically on prenominal adjectives. The short form of the adjective is interpreted as indefinite, while the long form is definite or specific:

- short (indefinite): Serbo-Croatian nov grad "a new city"; Lithuanian balta knyga "a white book"; Latvian balta māja "a white house"
- long (definite): novi grad "the new city, a certain new city"; baltoji knyga "the white book, a certain white book"; baltā māja, with a long vowel "the white house"

In some languages, the definiteness of the object affects the transitivity of the verb. In the absence of peculiar specificity marking, it also tends to affect the telicity of mono-occasional predications.

In some Scandinavian languages, such as Swedish, definite nouns inflect with a dedicated set of suffixes. This is known in Swedish as the grammatical category of species.

== See also ==
- Construct state
- Article (grammar)
- Topic–comment
- Specificity
