= Lexical field theory =

Theory in linguistics

Lexical field theory, or word-field theory, was introduced on March 12, 1931, by the German linguist Jost Trier. He argued that words acquired their meaning through their relationships to other words within the same word-field. An extension of the sense of one word narrows the meaning of neighboring words, with the words in a field fitting neatly together like a mosaic. If a single word undergoes a semantic change, then the whole structure of the lexical field changes. The lexical field is often used in English to describe terms further with use of different words.

Trier's theory assumes that lexical fields are easily definable closed sets, with no overlapping meanings or gaps. These assumptions have been questioned and the theory has been modified since its original formulation.

== Example ==
This is given by Trier himself. In early 20th century Germany, there were three different scales of school grades:

three scales of school grades
A	B	C
sehr gut	sehr gut	sehr gut
gut	gut	gut
genügend	genügend	befriedigend
		ausreichend
mangelhaft	mangelhaft	mangelhaft
	ungenügend	ungenügend

Consequently, knowing that a grade is "mangelhaft" depends on which grading scale is used. If in scale A, then it is the worst possible grade. If in scale B or C, then it is merely the second-worst possible grade. However, in scale B, since there are only 5 grades, being the second-worst is somewhat better than being the second-worst in scale C, which has 6 grades.

== Bibliography ==
- Bussmann, Hadumod (1996), Routledge Dictionary of Language and Linguistics, London: Routledge, s.v. lexical field theory.
- Grzega, Joachim (2004), Bezeichnungswandel: Wie, Warum, Wozu? Ein Beitrag zur englischen und allgemeinen Onomasiologie, Heidelberg: Winter.
- Lehrer, Adrienne (1974), Semantic Fields and Lexical Structure, Amsterdam: Benjamins.
- Trier, Jost (1931), Der deutsche Wortschatz im Sinnbezirk des Verstandes, Ph.D. diss. Bonn.

== See also ==
Semantic field
