= Semantic feature =

Conceptual component for a lexical item

A semantic feature is a component of the concept associated with a lexical item ('female' + 'performer' = 'actress'). More generally, it can also be a component of the concept associated with any grammatical unit, whether composed or not ('female' + 'performer' = 'the female performer' or 'the actress'). An individual semantic feature constitutes one component of a word's intention, which is the inherent sense or concept evoked. Linguistic meaning of a word is proposed to arise from contrasts and significant differences with other words. Semantic features enable linguistics to explain how words that share certain features may be members of the same semantic domain. Correspondingly, the contrast in meanings of words is explained by diverging semantic features. For example, father and son share the common components of "human", "kinship", "male" and are thus part of a semantic domain of male family relations. They differ in terms of "generation" and "adulthood", which is what gives each its individual meaning.

== Theoretical context ==
The analysis of semantic features is utilized in the field of linguistic semantics, more specifically the subfields of lexical semantics, and lexicology. One aim of these subfields is to explain the meaning of a word in terms of their relationships with other words. In order to accomplish this aim, one approach is to analyze the internal semantic structure of a word as composed of a number of distinct and minimal components of meaning. This approach is called componential analysis, also known as semantic decomposition. Semantic decomposition allows any given lexical item to be defined based on minimal elements of meaning, which are called semantic features. The term semantic feature is usually used interchangeably with the term semantic component. Additionally, semantic features/semantic components are also often referred to as semantic properties.

The theory of componential analysis and semantic features is not the only approach to analyzing the semantic structure of words. An alternative direction of research that contrasts with componential analysis is prototype semantics.

== Notation ==
The semantic features of a word can be notated using a binary feature notation common to the framework of componential analysis. A semantic property is specified in square brackets and a plus or minus sign indicates the existence or non-existence of that property.

- cat is
  - [+animate],
  - [+domesticated],
  - [+feline]
- puma is
  - [+animate],
  - [−domesticated],
  - [+feline]
- dog is
  - [+animate],
  - [+domesticated],
  - [−feline]
- wolf is
  - [+animate],
  - [−domesticated]
  - [−feline]

Intersecting semantic classes share the same features. Some features need not be specifically mentioned as their presence or absence is obvious from another feature. This is a redundancy rule.

== Bibliography ==
- Bussmann, Hadumod (1996). Trauth, Gregory; Kazzazi, Kerstin (eds.). Routledge dictionary of language and linguistics. Translated by Trauth, Gregory; Kazzazi, Kerstin (2nd completely revised ed.). London: Routledge. ISBN 0-415-02225-8.
- Fromkin, Victoria; Rodman, Robert; Hyams, Nina (2014). "Semantics: The Meanings of Language". An Introduction to Language (10th ed.). Boston, MA: Wadsworth, Cengage Learning. ISBN 978-1-133-31068-6.
- Lipka, Leonhard (1990). An outline of English lexicology : lexical structure, word semantics, and word-formation. Forschung & Studium Anglistik (2nd ed.). Tübingen: Niemeyer. ISBN 3-484-41003-5. ISSN 0178-7861.
- Nida, Eugene A. (1979). Componential analysis of meaning : an introduction to semantic structures (2nd ed.). The Hague: Mouton. ISBN 90-279-7927-8.
- O'Grady, William; Archibald, John; Aronoff, Mark; Rees-Miller, Janie (2010). Contemporary Linguistics: An Introduction (6th ed.). Boston, MA: Bedford/St. Martin's. ISBN 978-0-312-55528-3.
- Palmer, Frank R. (1981). Semantics (2nd ed.). Cambridge: Cambridge Univ. Press. ISBN 0-521-28376-0.
