= Object–verb word order =

Languages which place objects before verbs

In linguistics, languages with object–verb word order are those in which the object comes before the verb. Such languages compose approximately forty-seven percent of documented languages.

They are primarily left-branching, or head-final, with heads often found at the end of their phrases, with a resulting tendency to have the adjectives before nouns, to place adpositions after the noun phrases they govern (in other words, to use postpositions), to put relative clauses before their referents, and to place auxiliary verbs after the action verb. Of the OV languages that make use of affixes, many predominantly, or even exclusively, as in the case of Turkish, prefer suffixation to prefixation.

For example, English would be considered a VO language, and Japanese and Korean would be considered to be OV.

犬 が 猫 を 追いかけた
inu ga neko o oikaketa
{} {} object {} verb
The dog chased (verb) the cat (object)

개는 고양이를 쫓았다
gae-neun go-yang-i-reul jjo-chatt-da
{} object verb
The dog chased (verb) the cat (object)

Köpek, kediyi kovaladı.
{} object verb
The dog chased (verb) the cat (object)

Some languages, such as Finnish, Hungarian, Russian, and Yiddish, use both OV and VO constructions, but in other instances, such as Early Middle English, some dialects may use VO and others OV. Languages that contain both OV and VO construction may solidify into one or the other construction. A language that moves the verb or verb phrase more than the object will have surface VO word order, and a language which moves the object more than the verb or verb phrase will have surface OV word order.

== Subsets ==
- Subject–object–verb
- Object–subject–verb
- Object–verb–subject
