= Tariana language =

Maipurean language of Brazil

Tariana
- Tariano
- Taɾia yaɾupe
- Native to: Brazil, formerly Colombia
- Region: Upper and Middle Vaupés River in Amazonas
- Ethnicity: Tariana people: 1,910 in Brazil (2002), 330 in Colombia (2007)
- Native speakers: 100 (2003)
- Language family: Arawakan: Northern; Upper Amazon; Eastern Nawiki; Tariana

Official status
- Official language in: Brazil (Amazonas)

Language codes
- ISO 639-3: tae
- Glottolog: tari1256
- ELP: Tariana

Tariana (also Tariano, Tariana: Taɾia yaɾupe) is an endangered Maipurean (also known as Arawak) language spoken along the Vaupés River in Amazonas, Brazil by approximately 100 people. Another approximately 1,500 people in the upper and middle Vaupés River area identify themselves as ethnic Tariana but do not speak the language fluently.

The Indigenous people of the Vaupés region, including the Tariana and East Tucano peoples, are linguistically exogamous; they consider fellow speakers of their languages blood relatives. In this region, languages—like tribal identity—are passed down through patrilineal descent, and as such are kept strictly separate from one another, with minimal lexical borrowing occurring among them. The Indigenous people of this region traditionally spoke between three and ten other languages, including their mother's and father's tongues—which were usually different due to the widespread cultural practice of linguistic exogamy—and Spanish and/or Portuguese.

Speakers of Tariana have been switching to the unrelated Tucano language (of the Tucanoan family), which became a lingua franca in the Vaupés region in the late 19th century. Arriving in the region in the 1920s, Salesian missionaries promoted the exclusive use of Tucano among Indians in an effort to convert them. Economic concerns have also led fathers to increasingly leave their families to work for non-Indigenous Brazilians, which has undermined the patrilineal father-child interaction through which Tariana was traditionally acquired. In 1999, efforts were made to teach Tariana as a second language in the secondary school in Iauaretê. Regular classes in Tariana have been offered at the school since 2003.

Research on Tariana, including a grammar book and a Tariana-Portuguese dictionary, has been done by Alexandra Aikhenvald from the La Trobe University, a specialist on the Arawak language family.

== Phonology ==
Tariana has a relatively large phoneme inventory, compared to other Vaupés languages such as Baniwa and Tucano. It has a rare set of phonotactic restrictions that determine whether phonemes can occur initially or medially and in which types of morphemes. The phoneme [tʃ], for example, can occur initially in roots but not in affixes or enclitics.

⟨Angle brackets⟩ indicate the orthography used by Alexandra Aikhenvald in her Grammar of Tariana. IPA transcription is indicated if it differs from the standard orthography.

=== Vowels ===
Tariana has 6 vowels, all of which may occur nasalized, except for [ɨ], or long, except for [ɨ] and [ɵ].

	Front			Central		Back		
	short	nasal	long	short	nasal	short	nasal	long
Close	i	ĩ	iː	ɨ		u	ũ	uː
Close-mid	e	ẽ	eː	ɵ ⟨o⟩	ɵ̃ ⟨õ⟩			
Open						a	ã	aː

Phonotactic Restrictions on the Occurrence of Vowels
Phoneme	Root-Initial	Affix-Initial	Enclitic-Initial	Root-Medial	Affix-Medial	Enclitic-Medial	Root-Final	Affix- or Enclitic-Final
i	+	+	+	+	+	+	+	+
e	+	-	-	+	+	+	+	+
ɨ (Note: ɨ occurs only in the augmentative enclitic =pɨ and in the onomatopoeic ɨhmeni "moan". It also occasionally appears as an allophone of i in the following words: marawati → marawatɨ "a type of snuff", hitísi → hitɨsi "tear", and -pití → pitɨ "chase away, kick". Its occurrence in Tariana has been ascribed to the influence of Tucano.)	+	-	-	-	-	-	-	+
o	-	-	-	+	-	+	+	+ one enclitic
u	+	-	-	+	+	+	+	+
a	+	+	+	+	+	+	+	+
iː	+	-	-	+	-	-	-	-
eː	+	-	-	+	-	-	-	-
uː	+	-	-	+	-	-	+	-
aː	+	-	-	+	-	-	+	-
ĩ	-	-	-	+	-	-	+	-
ẽ	-	-	-	+	-	-	+	-
õ (Note: õ occurs only in the following words: tõkẽ "firefly", siwirikõrena "tapiriri, Tapirira guianensis", nuitõ "daughter! (vocative)", and -tõreta "roll into a thin roll, like a cigarette". It also occurs word-initially in place names of Tucano origin (e.g. Õrõreana).)	-	-	-	+	-	-	+	-
ũ	+	-	-	+	-	-	-	-
ã	+	-	-	+	-	-	+	-

=== Consonants ===
Tariana has 24 consonants:

			Bilabial	Dental	Alveo- palatal	Palatal	Velar	Glottal
Plosive	voiceless	unaspirated	p	t̪ ⟨t⟩			k	
Plosive	voiceless	aspirated	pʰ ⟨ph⟩	t̪ʰ ⟨th⟩			kʰ ⟨kh⟩	
Plosive	voiced	unaspirated	b	d̪ ⟨d⟩			(g) (Note: The phoneme /ɡ/ occurs only in loanwords from Portuguese (e.g. the names Graciliano, Gabriel).)	
Plosive	voiced	aspirated		d̪ʰ ⟨dh⟩				
Fricative					s̺ ⟨s⟩			h
Affricate						t͡ɕ ⟨tʃ⟩		
Nasal		unaspirated	m	n̪ ⟨n⟩		ɲ ⟨ñ⟩		
Nasal		aspirated	mʰ ⟨mh⟩	n̪ʰ ⟨nh⟩		ɲʰ ⟨ñh⟩		
Flap					ɾ̺ ⟨r⟩			
Lateral					l̺ ⟨l⟩			
Semivowel		unaspirated	w			j ⟨y⟩		
Semivowel		aspirated	wʰ ⟨wh⟩					

A tendency to insert a glottal stop /ʔ/ after word-final /a/ has been noted among younger speakers. That has been ascribed to the influence of Tucano.

Phonotactic Restrictions on the Occurrence of Consonants
Phoneme	Root-Initial	Affix-Initial	Enclitic-Initial	Root-Medial	Affix-Medial	Enclitic-Medial	Comments
p	+	+	+	+	-	-	
ph	+	+	-	+	+	+	
b	+	-	+	(+) only noun roots	-	-	mostly in loans
t	+	+	+	+	+	+	
th	+	+	+	+	+	+	
d	+	+	+	+	+	+	
dh	(+) one root	-	(+) two enclitics	-	-	-	occurs word-initially as a result of h-metathesis
k	+	+	+	+	+	+	
kh	+	+	+	+	-	-	
s	+	+	+	+	+	+	
tʃ	+	-	-	+	-	-	
h	+	+	+	restricted	-	-	
m	+	+	+	+	+	-	
mh	+	(+)	(+) two enclitics	+	-	-	often as a result of h-metathesis
n	+	+	+	+	+	+	
nh	+	-	+	+	-	-	often as a result of h-metathesis
ñ	+	-	(+) enclitic	+	-	+ one enclitic	
ñh	+ (two roots)	-	-	+ one root	-	-	only in three roots
r	+	+	+	+	+	+	does not occur in word-initial position
l	+	-	-	+	-	-	
w	+	+	+	+	+	+	
wh	+	+	-	+	-	(+) one enclitic	result of h-metathesis word-initially and word-medially
y	+	+	+	+	+	+	

(+) indicates phoneme appears in a limited set of items.

=== Syllable structure ===
Syllables in Tariana follow the pattern (C)V(C₂), where C₂ can be either /h/, /j/, or rarely /n/. Phoneme occurrence is also restricted by morphological context, with certain phonemes only in certain positions (initially and medially) or within certain types of morphemes. Vowels may be elided or reduced in rapid speech, rendering some syllables VC or CVC. For example, the word di-dusitá 'he goes back' becomes [didusta] in rapid speech, with the elision of the pre-tonic i. Similarly, the word di-pitá=kà=sità 'he bathes' becomes [dipitakaəsta], with the pre-tonic i being elided and a [ə] inserted at the clitic boundary before the s. (Hyphens mark affixes; equals signs mark clitics.)

=== Stress ===
Tariana has both primary and secondary stress. Tariana is a pitch-accent language, with stressed syllables indicated by a higher pitch and a greater intensity in pronunciation. Unstressed syllables are undifferentiated from non-stressed syllables except in their intensity. Long vowels are always stressed as well as most nasal vowels. Otherwise, primary stress may fall on the last three syllables. Penultimate stress in most common in monomorphemic words (e.g. dúpu "a lizard"), but antepenultimate (e.g. képira "bird") and final stress (e.g. yapuratú "long flute used at ritual offering") also occurs. All roots have underlying stress. Prefixes are unstressed, and suffixes may be stressed or unstressed. Suffixes with underlying stress generally cause penultimate stress when they are attached to a root (e.g. máwi 'hook'→mawípi 'blowgun').

=== Phonological processes ===
==== Vowel reduction ====
In rapid speech, e, i, and a are reduced to ə in pre- and post-tonic syllables. Pre-tonic reduction occurs in the third syllable before the primary stress (e.g. yarumakási→yərumamkási "clothing") as well as in word-initial syllables (e.g. yakóreka→yəkóreka "door"). Vowels are also reduced in syllables preceding a secondary stress (e.g. makhà→məkhà "recent past non-visual"). Post-tonic reduction affects word-final syllables (e.g. yásene→yásenə "the Tucano").

==== H-metathesis ====
H-metathesis occurs if an h-initial root or suffix follows a prefix or a root, respectively. The process follows one of three patterns:

- CV- + hVX → ChVX → CʰVX, if C is a stop, nasal, or bilabial glide.

di- + -híma = dhi-ima
3SG.NF {} hear {} {he hears}

If there are multiple CV syllables preceding the h-initial root or suffix if the C is a stop, nasal, or bilabial glide, the h metathesizes to the first of them.

ñamá + -hípa = ñhamá-ipa
two {} {NUM CLF:human} {} {two humans}

- V₁- + hV₂X → hV₁V₂X (→hV₂X if V₁=V₂)

i- + -hípa = {hi-ipa → hípa}
2PL {} grab {} {you PL grab}

- CV + VwhV → ChVwV → CʰVw, when C is a stop, nasal, or bilabial glide.

pá + -iwhi = phéwi
one {} {CLF:thin particle-like things} {} {one thin particle-like thing}

Vowel coalescence occurs, with the a+i resulting in an e, but that occurs only in the case of h-metathesis and not elsewhere.

== Morphology ==
Tariana is a polysynthetic language, with both head-marking and dependent-marking elements. Verbs are differentiated by those that take prefixes: active transitive and intransitive, and those that do not: stative verbs and verbs that describe physical states. Nouns divide into those that can be possessed/prefixed and those that are prefixless. Adjectives in Tariana share a number of features with Nouns and Verbs – the majority of affixes used are the same as those of nouns.^{:66-83} The -O suffix has generally been lost in Tariana, while the -nuku dependent-marking suffix has been gained. In any non-subject function, this suffix may be added to a noun. There is evidence that dependent markers have been gained via local diffusion, as all Tucano language in the area utilize dependent markers. Overall, dependent markers seem to have been gained in response to the loss of half of the head-markings.

=== Nouns ===
Nominal words may include up to 16 structural positions, which are defined as follows (hyphens mark affixes; equals signs marks clitics):

- Possessive, negative ma-, or relative ka- prefix
- Root
- Gender-sensitive derivational suffix
- Derivational classifier suffix
- Plural marker
- Pejorative =yana (plural -pe)
- Approximative =iha 'more or less'
- Diminutive =tuki (plural =tupe) or augmentative =pasi (plural =pe)
- Tense (past or future)
- Extralocality =wya and restrictivity =mia 'just, only'
- Oblique case =ne 'comitative-instrumental'
- Oblique case -se 'locative'
- Contrastive =se
- Coordinative =misini, =sini 'also'
- Focused A/S =ne/=nhe
- Topical non-subject =nuku

The following noun phrase includes 13 of the possible structural positions. Brackets indicate syntactic structure.

[ [ [nu-phe-ru-ma-pe =yana-pe =tupe =miki] -ite] =ne =se =misini =nuku]
{} {} 1SG-older.sibling-FEM-CL:FEM-PL =PEJ-PL =DIM:PL =PAST:PL -CL:person =COM =CNTR =TOO:PART.CNTR =TOP.NON.A/S
"with this very person belonging to my bad little older sisters, too"

==== Pronouns ====
Tariana uses an Arawak's common set of prefixes to mark A/Sₐ on its verbs and pronominal possession on possessed nouns. These prefixes also form independent personal pronouns when combined with the emphatic particle -ha-.^{:122}

		Singular		Plural	
		Prefix	Pronoun	Prefix	Pronoun
1st person		nu-	nuha	wa-	w(a)ha
2nd person		pi-	piha, phia	i-	iha
3rd person	NF	di-	diha, dihya	na-	n(a)ha
3rd person	F	du-	diha, duhua	na-	n(a)ha
Impersonal		pa-	p(a)ha	-	-
Indefinite*		i-	-	-	-

The indefinite prefix

This is a nominal morphological aspect shared with Baniwa of Içana and Baré, two of Tariana’s Arawak sisters. This prefix uniquely permits these languages in signifying that the subject/possessor is unknown. However, the prefix appears primarily linked to nouns in Tariana, wherein the others it applies to both nouns and verbs.

=== Verbs ===
Predicates in Tariana may include up to nine affixes, which are defined as follows:

- Cross-referencing prefixes or negative ma- or relative ka-
- Root
- Thematic syllable
- Causative -i, -ita
- Negative -(ka)de
- Reciprocal -kaka
- -ina 'almost, a little bit'
- Topic-advancing -ni, or passive -kana, or purposive non-visual -hyu or purposive visual -karu
- Verbal classifiers
- Benefactive -pena

Suffixes may be followed by a number of enclitics, as follows (note that ! marks a floating clitic):

- Intentional, 'be about to' =kasu
- Mood (imperative, declarative, frustrative -tha, conditional -buhta, apprehensive -da/-nhia, interrogative fused with evidentiality and tense)
- Aspect 'zone' I, includes habitual prescribed =hyuna 'what you do and what you ought to do', customary =kape, habitual repetitive -nipe, anterior =nhi
- a/b ! Evidentiality and tense (e.g. =mha=na 'non-visual-remote.past')
- Epistemic =da 'doubt', =pada 'isn't it true that'
- Aktionsart (manner or extent of associated action, e.g. 'split open', 'step on and feel pain', 'away')
- ! Degree: augmentative 'indeed', diminutive, approximative, excessive
- Aspect 'zone' II, includes prolonged/ongoing =daka 'yet, still', perfective =sita 'already accomplished', ! repetitive =pita, =ta 'once again', ! completive =niki 'totally, completely'
- Switch reference and clause-chaining
- ! Emphatic enclitics a/ya, wani; evidence sõ

The following verb construction includes 11 of the 20 possible structural positions:

ma-thuka-i-ta-kade-kaka =tha =pidana =bosa =niki =ka
NEG-break-CAUS1-CAUS2-NEG-REC =FRUST =REMP.P.INFR =SPLIT.OPEN =COMPL =SUB
"While (they) apparently did not break each other by splitting open totally in vain..."

=== Tense-evidentiality ===
Tariana has a system of obligatory tense-evidentiality markers, which take the form of clitics on verbs. There are four tenses: present, recent past, remote past, and future. In affirmative clauses, non-future tenses fuse with evidentials to designate visual, non-visual, inferred generic, inferred specific, and reported information. The inferred specific evidential is a recent innovation and has been ascribed to the influence of Tucano. It is a combination of the anterior aspect marker -nhi and non-present visual evidentials -ka and -na producing -nhika for recent past inferred specific and -nhina for remote past inferred specific.

		Present	Recent Past	Remote Past
Visual		-naka	-ka	-na
Non-Visual		-mha	-mahka	-mhana
Inferred	Generic	-	-sika	-sina
Inferred	Specific	-	-nihka	-nhina
Reported		-pida	-pidaka	-pidana

In interrogative clauses, the same three non-future tenses fuse with evidentials to designate visual, non-visual, and inferred information. Evidentiality, in interrogative clauses, indicates the speaker's assumptions about the addressee's source of information. Use of an inferred evidential, for example, implies that the speaker assumes the addressee not to have direct access to evidence on the subject at hand. Note the remote past non-visual is rarely used except as a "conventionalized conversation sustainer," an interrogative repetition of a storyteller's predicates to indicate listeners' attention.

Tense-Evidentiality in Interrogative Clauses
	Present	Recent Past	Remote Past
Visual	-nha	-nihka	-nhina
Non-Visual	-tha,-mha	-mha	(-mhana)
Inferred	-	-sika	-sina

There are two future tense markers in Tariana, neither of which indicates evidentiality. The definite future marker -de is used only in the first person, but the indefinite future marker -mahde may be used for any person.

== Syntax ==
=== Word order ===
Word order in Tariana is "pragmatically based" and is generally free except for a handful of specific contexts:

- Complements of the positive copula alia must precede the copula.
- Interrogative words typically occur clause-initially.
- Clause and sentence connectors occur sentence-initially.
- Predicates occur clause-finally in dependent clauses.
- Subjects of imperative and apprehensive constructions follow the verb.
- In "double S-clauses," "References to emotional states and contain an inalienably possessed body part," the body part must precede the predicate.

du-kare du-wara-ka
3SG.F-heart 3SG.NF-diminish-REC.P.VIS
"She is worried (lit. she diminished with respect to her heart)."

=== Noun phrases ===
Noun phrases comprise a head, which may be a noun, adjective, demonstrative, specifier article, quantifier, or deictic as well as one or more modifiers. Modifiers must agree with the head in animacy and in number if the head is animate. Specifier articles, demonstratives, and the quantifier kanapada 'how many, how much; this many, this much' always precede the head. All other modifiers may either precede or follow the head. In general, modifiers precede a definite or topical noun and follow an "indefinite, non-specific, or otherwise inconsequential nominal referent."

ne ma:tʃite hema-yana di-swa-nhi-na
then bad+NCL:ANIM tapir-PEJ 3SG.NF-lie-ANT-REM.P.VIS
"Then a naughty (well-known) bad tapir was lying (there)."

Even though the noun 'tapir' has just been introduced, the fact that the adjective 'bad' precedes it indicates that it is well-known or topical.

=== Case ===
Tariana is essentially a nominative–accusative morphosyntactic alignment. Its core cases are broadly analyzed as falling into the categories of A/S 'subject' and non-A/S 'non-subject'.

A stands for a transitive subject, S for a subject of an intransitive verb, S for a subject of an active intransitive verb, Sₒfor a subject of a stative intransitive verb, and S for a subject of an intransitive verb with a non-canonically marked argument.

Case marking is determined by the discourse status of the noun (topical, non-topical, focused).

Grammatical Function	Discourse Status	Nouns	Pronouns
A, Sₐ, Sₒ	non-topical/topical	-Ø	-Ø
A, Sₐ, Sₒ	focused	-nhe/-ne	
Non-A/Sₐ/Sₒ and also Sᵢₒ	non-topical	-Ø	-na
Non-A/Sₐ/Sₒ and also Sᵢₒ	topical	-nuku/-naku	

A noun in the A/S /Sₒcategory is considered focused if it meets one of the following conditions:

- A/Sₐ/S is a key participant in contrastive focus to another argument.
- A/Sₐ/Sₒis presented as a main participant in the discourse or is a newly introduced but already-known participant important for future discourse.
- A/Sₐ/Sₒmust be disambiguated.

A noun in the non-A/Sₐ/Sₒis considered topical if it meets one of the following conditions:

- The noun is or will be the topic of the narrative.
- The noun is referential, specific, and/or definite.
- The noun is important but not necessarily contrastive.

Tariana has two oblique cases: the locational and the instrumental/comitative, but only nouns may be marked for both. Pronouns are marked only for the instrumental/comitative.

Case	Nouns	Pronouns
Locative	-se	(none)
Instrumental/Comitative	-ne	-ine

Because oblique cases are inherently non-A/Sₐ/S, they may be double-marked if they serve as the topic of the sentence as well. The following example is from a hunter's narrative about improving his house, with 'house' being the topic of the narrative. In this sentence, 'house' is marked both as a topical non-A/Sₐ/S and locational.

nu-ñha nu-dia nhua nu-ya-dapana-se-nuku
1SG-eat 1SG-return I 1SG-POSS-CL:HAB-LOC-TOP.NON.A/S
"I'll go back to eat (my catch) in my very house.'

=== Switch reference ===
	Same Subject	Different Subject
Prior	-hyume/-yuhme 'after; because'	-kayami 'after'
Simultaneous	-nikhe, -kakari 'during, while'	-nisawa, -kanada, -nipua, -piyana, -kariku, -kapua 'while, during'

Tariana switch reference enclitics indicate whether the action of a dependent clause is simultaneous with or prior to the action of the main clause and whether the subject of the dependent clause is the same or different from the subject of the main clause. In rapid speech, the enclitic -hyume often becomes -yuhme or even -yume. -Kayami can be pronounced -kañami or -kayãmi. Note that there are several different enclitics for simultaneous action categories. Each enclitic has various restrictions as to which other clitics and affixes it can combine with, and where it falls within a clause or sentence.

[inari na-matʃika-hyume] nhemathani-pidana
mucura.rat 3PL-be.bad+TH-AFTER:SS 3PL+shout-REM.P.REP
"After they transformed into mucura rats, they shouted."

Brackets indicate syntactic structure.
