= Zero marker =

A zero marker is a null morpheme being used as linguistic marker, see:

- Zero (linguistics)
- Zero-marking language
- Zero-marking in English

Zero marker is not to be confused with Kilometre zero, frequently represented by a ceremonial marker.

== See also ==
- Zero copula
