= Subject–object–verb word order =

Feature of language

In linguistic typology, a subject–object–verb (SOV) language is one in which the subject, object, and verb of a sentence always or usually appear in that order. If English were SOV, "Sam apples ate" would be an ordinary sentence, as opposed to the actual Standard English "Sam ate apples" which is subject–verb–object (SVO). Together, SVO and SOV account for more than 87% of the world's languages, while the three "subject before object" orders make up almost 96%.

The term is often loosely used for ergative languages like Adyghe and Basque that in fact have agents instead of subjects.

== Incidence ==
Order	Example	Usage	Languages
SOV	"Sam apples ate."	45%	Ainu, Akkadian, Amharic, Ancient Greek, Armenian, Aymara, Bambara, Basque, Bengali, Burmese, Burushaski, Chukchi, Cushitic languages, Dravidian languages, Elamite, Hindustani, Hittite, Hopi, Itelmen, Japanese, Korean, Kurdish, Kurukh, Latin, Lhasa Tibetan, Manchu, Mongolian, Munda languages, Nahuatl, Navajo, Nepali, Nivkh, Northeast Caucasian languages, Northwest Caucasian languages, Pali, Pashto, Persian, Quechua, Sanskrit, Sinhala, Siouan-Catawban languages, Tamil, Tigrinya, Turkic languages, Yukaghir
SVO	"Sam ate apples."	42%	Arabic (modern spoken varieties), Chinese (Mandarin, Cantonese, etc.), English, Estonian, Finnish, Hausa, Hebrew, Indonesian, Kashmiri, Malay, most European languages, Pa'O, Swahili, Thai, Vietnamese, Yucatec Maya
VSO	"Ate Sam apples."	9%	Arabic (classical and modern standard), Berber languages, Biblical Hebrew, Celtic languages, Filipino, Geʽez, Kariri, Mayan languages, Polynesian languages
VOS	"Ate apples Sam."	3%	Algonquian languages, Arawakan languages, Car, Chumash, Fijian, K'iche, Malagasy, Otomanguean languages, Qʼeqchiʼ, Salishan languages, Terêna
OVS	"Apples ate Sam."	1%	Äiwoo, Hixkaryana, Urarina
OSV	"Apples Sam ate."	0%	Haida, Tobati, Warao
Frequency distribution of word order in languages surveyed by Russell S. Tomlin in the 1980s

Among natural languages with a word order preference, SOV is the most common type (followed by subject–verb–object; the two types account for more than 87% of natural languages with a preferred order).

Languages that have SOV structure include:

- most Indo-Iranian languages (Assamese, Bengali, Gujarati, Hajong, Hindustani, Kurdish, Marathi, Nepali, Odia, Pāli, Pashto, Persian, Punjabi, Sindhi, Sinhala, Zaza)
- Ainu
- Akkadian
- Armenian
- Assyrian
- Aymara
- Basque
- Burushaski
- Cherokee
- Cushitic languages (Afar, Beja, Bilen, Oromo, Saho, Sidama, Somali)
- Dravidian languages (Brahvi, Duruwa, Gondi, Kannada, Kurukh, Malayalam, Tamil, Telugu, Tulu)
- Dogon languages
- Elamite
- Ethio-Semitic languages (Amharic, Tigre, Tigrinya)
- Gothic
- Ancient Greek
- Greenlandic
- Haida
- Hittite
- Hopi
- Ijoid languages
- Itelmen
- Japonic languages (Japanese, Hachijō, Ryukyuan languages)
- Koreanic languages (Korean, Jeju)
- Classical Latin
- Mande languages
- all Munda languages (Santali, Mundari, Kharia etc)
- Mongolic languages (such as Mongolian)
- Navajo
- Nivkh
- Nobiin
- Omotic languages
- Quechua
- Samoyedic languages
- Senufo languages
- Seri
- Sri Lanka Malay
- Sumerian
- nearly all Tibeto-Burman languages (Burmese, Meitei, Newar, Sunwar, Lhasa Tibetan, Zou)
- Siouan languages (including Lakota, Dakota, and Omaha-Ponca)
- Tungusic languages, including Evenki, Manchu and Xibe
- Turkic languages
- almost all Uto-Aztecan languages
- Yukaghir
- Zarma
- virtually all languages of the Caucasus

Other languages allow for an SOV structure under certain conditions:

- Standard Chinese is generally SVO but common constructions with verbal complements require SOV or OSV.
- Some Romance languages are SVO, but when the object is an enclitic pronoun, word order allows for SOV.
- German and Dutch are considered SVO in conventional typology and SOV in generative grammar. They can be considered SOV but with V2 word order as an overriding rule for the finite verb in main clauses, which results in SVO in some cases and VSO in others. For example, in German, a basic sentence such as "Ich sage etwas über Karl" ("I say something about Karl") is in SVO word order. Non-finite verbs are placed at the end, however, since V2 only applies to the finite verb: "Ich will etwas über Karl sagen" ("I want to say something about Karl"). In a subordinate clause, the finite verb is not affected by V2, and also appears at the end of the sentence, resulting in full SOV order: "Nun sage ich ihr, dass Karl einen Gürtel gekauft hat." (Word-for-word: "Now say I [to] her that Karl a belt bought has.")

A rare example of SOV word order in English is "I (subject) thee (object) wed (verb)" in the wedding vow "With this ring, I thee wed."

== Properties ==
SOV languages have a strong tendency to use postpositions rather than prepositions, to place auxiliary verbs after the action verb, to place genitive noun phrases before the possessed noun, to place a name before a title or honorific ("James Uncle" and "Johnson Doctor" rather than "Uncle James" and "Doctor Johnson") and to have subordinators appear at the end of subordinate clauses. They have a weaker but significant tendency to place demonstrative adjectives before the nouns they modify. Relative clauses preceding the nouns to which they refer usually signals SOV word order, but the reverse does not hold: SOV languages feature prenominal and postnominal relative clauses roughly equally. SOV languages also seem to exhibit a tendency towards using a time–manner–place ordering of adpositional phrases.

In linguistic typology, one can usefully distinguish two types of SOV languages in terms of their type of marking:

1. dependent-marking has case markers to distinguish the subject and the object, which allows it to use the variant OSV word order without ambiguity. This type usually places adjectives and numerals before the nouns they modify, and is exclusively suffixing without prefixes. SOV languages of this first type include Japanese and Tamil.
2. head-marking distinguishes subject and object by affixes on the verb rather than markers on the nouns. It also differs from the dependent-marking SOV language in using prefixes as well as suffixes, usually for tense and possession. Adjectives in this type are much more verb-like than in dependent-marking SOV languages, and hence they usually follow the nouns. In most SOV languages with a significant level of head-marking or verb-like adjectives, numerals and related quantifiers (like "all", "every") also follow the nouns they modify. Languages of this type include Navajo and Seri.

In practice, of course, the distinction between these two types is far from sharp. Many SOV languages are substantially double-marking and tend to exhibit properties intermediate between the two idealised types above.

Many languages that have shifted to SVO word order from earlier SOV retain (at least to an extent) the properties; for example, the Finnish language, which retains a high usage of postpositions.

== Examples ==
=== Afroasiatic languages ===
SOV word order is generally found in the Afroasiatic branches of the Ethiopian language area (Cushitic, Omotic, and contemporary Ethio-Semitic).

==== Afar ====
Anu makiina liyo
I car have-1SG.IND
Subject Object Verb
I have a car.

==== Amharic ====
ተስፋዬ በሩን ዘጋው
Täsəfayē bärun zägaw
Tesfaye {the door} closed
Subject Object Verb
Tesfaye closed the door.

==== Oromo ====
Ayyantu buna dhugti
Ayantu coffee drinks
Subject Object Verb
Ayantu drinks coffee.

==== Somali ====
Somali generally uses the subject–object–verb structure when speaking formally.

Anaa albaab-ka furay
I door-DEF opened
Subject Object Verb
I opened the door

==== Tigre ====
ህቱ {እግል ልሽቀ} መጽኣ
Htu {ʾəgl ləšqä} mäṣʾa.
He {to work} PST-come-3SG
Subject Object Verb
He came to work.

==== Tigrinya ====
ዳኒኤል ኩዑሶ ቀሊዑ
Daniʼēl kuʻuso qäliʻu
Daniel ball {he kicked}
Subject Object Verb
Daniel kicked the ball.

==== Wolaitta ====
Táání miishsh-áa (7e)kk-áas
I money-ABS.M.SG take-PFV.1SG
Subject Object Verb
I made money.

=== Ainu ===
The following example is from Hokkaido Ainu.

Matkaci cep hok
girl fish buy
Subject Object Verb
The girl buys fish.

=== Austroasiatic languages ===
Many Austroasiatic languages in South Asia exhibit SOV word order typical to the region.

==== Santali ====
iɲ dɔ uni ɲɛl-ke-d-e-a-ɲ
I TOP he see-ACT.AOR-TR-3SG.OBJ-IND-1SG.SUBJ
Subject Particle Object Verb
I saw him.

==== Ho ====
Dobro Soba-ke tʃiʈi kul-e-i-ten-e
Dobro Soba-OBL letter send-ACT.APPL.IPFV-3SG.OBJ-PROG-IND
Subject Recipient Object Verb
Dobro is sending a letter to Soba.

==== Kharia ====
Kharia can be described as generally predicate-final, although Peterson (2011) suggests that "there is no evidence for a "syntactic subject" in Kharia." S/A arguments may or may not be overtly mentioned, as the identification of the S/A arguments is evident by the presence of encliticized subject markers.

kol ob-ɲoʔ ɖom dhab=na laʔ=ki=kiyar
RECP CAUS-eat PASS SUD=INF IPFV=MID.PST=DU.HON
'[they] were being fed by each other quickly.'

iɲ lebu=ki=te yo=yoˀj ro peʔ ɲokh=oʔ=ki
I person=PL=OBL see=ACT.PST.1SG and rice eat=ACT.PST=PL
'I saw the people and [they] ate rice.'

==== Sora ====
The following example is from a speaker of the Lanjia dialect of Sora:

ambin ajɔ-n a-diɲ-t-ɛ
You(plural) fish-NSFX 2-cook-NPST-3
'You guys cook fish.'

=== Basque ===
Basque in short sentences, usually, subject or agent–object–verb; in long sentences, usually, subject or agent-verb-objects:

Enekok sagarra ekarri du
{Eneko (+ERG)} {the apple} {brought (to bring)} {AUX has}
Agent Object Verb {}
Eneko has brought the apple

Eneritzek eskatu du {+ + +}
{Eneritz (+ERG)} {asked for} {AUX has} {+ + +}
Parts Agent Verb Objects
Eneritz requested the book nobody wanted to read

Anyway, both in spoken and written Basque, the pure SOV sentence (Eneritzek inork irakurri nahi ez zuen liburua eskatu du) is perfectly valid, just as the OVS order (Inork irakurri nahi ez zuen liburua eskatu du Eneritzek). In questions, fronting the verb in a VSO sentence is also correct (Eskatu (al) du Eneritzek inork irakurri nahi ez zuen liburua?), together with the usual SOV order (Eneritzek inork irakurri nahi ez zuen liburua eskatu (al) du?) or the SVO one (Eneritzek eskatu (al) du inork irakurri nahi ez zuen liburua?).

=== Dravidian languages ===
The Dravidian languages commonly exhibit or prefer SOV order.

==== Kannada ====
ನಾನು ಮನೆ ಕಟ್ಟಿದೆನು
Naanu mane kaTTidenu
I {the house} built
Subject Object Verb
I built the house.

==== Malayalam ====
ഞാൻ പുസ്തകം എ എടുത്തു
ñān pustakam̥ (-e) eṭuttu
I {(the) book} ACC took
Subject Object {} Verb
I took the book.

- Pustakam̥ + -e = pustakatte (പുസ്തകത്തെ)

==== Tamil ====
Tamil being a strongly head-final language, the basic word-order is SOV. However, since it is highly inflected, word order is flexible and is used for pragmatic purposes. That is, fronting a word in a sentence adds emphasis on it; for instance, a VSO order would indicate greater emphasis on the verb, the action, than on the subject or the object. However, such word-orders are highly marked, and the basic order remains SOV.

நான் பெட்டியைத் திறப்பேன்.
Nān peṭṭi-yai tiṟa-pp-ēn.
I-NOM box-ACC open-FUT-1SG
Subject Object Verb
I will open the box.

==== Telugu ====
నేను ఇంటికి వెళ్తున్నాను
Nēnu iṇṭi-ki veḷ-tunnā-nu
{I-NOM} {home-DAT} {go-PRES-1SG}
Subject Object Verb
I am going home.

=== Georgian ===
The Georgian language is not extremely rigid with regards to word order, but is typically either SOV or SVO.

მე ლექსი დავწერე.
me leksi davc'ere
I poem {[I]wrote}
Subject Object Verb
I wrote (a) poem.

=== Greenlandic ===
The default word order for simple clauses in Greenlandic is SOV.

Niviarsiaq qaqqaq-mut majuaq-Vuq
{girl-ABS.SG} {mountain-ALL.SG} {ascend-IND.3SG}
Subject Object Verb
The/a girl climbed the/a mountain.

=== Indo-European languages ===
SOV word order is quite common among Indo-European languages, leading to a common hypothesis that this reflects the original preferred word order of the ancestral Proto-Indo-European language. However, the question remains unsettled.

==== Albanian ====
Albanian has free word order, but generally prefers SVO. SOV occurs only in poetic language.

Agimi librin {e mori}
Agimi {the book} took
Subject Object Verb
Agimi took the book. (It was Agimi who took the book)

==== Armenian ====
Armenian generally prefers SOV.

Իմ անունը Շուշանիկ է
Im anunə Šušanik ē
my name Shushanik is
{} Subject Object Verb
My name is Shushanik.

==== Germanic languages ====
Linguistic consensus holds that the Proto-Germanic language had free word order but preferred SOV. While some Germanic languages (including English and most North Germanic languages) have transitioned to SVO, SOV remains a feature of some major modern Germanic languages, including German and Dutch. However, these modern SOV Germanic languages also exhibit V2 word order, which supersedes the "default" SOV such that many sentences are rendered subject-verb-object.

===== Dutch =====
Dutch is SOV combined with V2 word order. The non-finite verb (infinitive or participle) remains in final position, but the finite (i.e. inflected) verb is moved to the second position. Simple verbs look like SVO, non-finite verbs (participles, infinitives) and compound verbs follow this pattern:

Ik wil je helpen
I {want to} you help
subject FIN.verb object NFIN.verb
I want to help you.

Pure SOV order is found in subordinate clauses:

Ik zei dat ik je wil helpen
I said that I you want {to help}
subject FIN.verb SUBORD.CONJ subject object FIN.verb NFIN.verb
I said that I want to help you.

===== German =====
German is SOV combined with V2 word order. The non-finite verb (infinitive or participle) remains in final position, but the finite (i.e. inflected) verb is moved to the second position. Simple verbs look like SVO, compound verbs follow this pattern:

Er hat einen Apfel gegessen.
He has an apple eaten.
Subject Auxiliary {} Object Verb
He has eaten an apple.

The word order changes also depending on whether the phrase is a main clause or a dependent clause. In dependent clauses, the word order is always entirely SOV (cf. also Inversion):

Weil Horst einen Apfel gegessen hat.
Because Horst an apple eaten has.
Conjunction Subject {} Object Verb Auxiliary
Because Horst has eaten an apple.

===== Gothic =====
The Gothic language, an extinct East Germanic language, had free word order, but SOV constructions were common.

𐌲𐌿𐌼𐌰 𐌵𐌹𐌽𐍉𐌽 𐍆𐍂𐌹𐌾𐍉𐌸.
Guma qinon frijoþ.
man woman loves.
Subject Object Verb
The man loves the woman.

==== Greek (Classical) ====
Ancient Greek had free word order but generally preferred SOV sentences:

ὁ ανήρ τὸν παĩδα φιλεῖ.
ho anḗr tòn paîda phileî
The man the child loves.
{} Subject {} Object Verb
The man loves the child.

This is distinct from Modern Greek, where SVO is preferred.

==== Indo-Aryan languages ====
Vedic Sanskrit, the oldest known of the Indo-Aryan languages, was an inflected language and very flexible in word order, allowing all possible word combinations. Its descendant, Classical Sanskrit, shared this feature but generally preferred SOV sentences.

तत्त् (त्)वम सि
tát t(ú)vam ási
that you are
Subject Object Verb
That you are.

Most later Indo-Aryan languages continue to prefer SOV word order, for example:

Bengali:

আমি ভাত খাই
ami bʰat kʰai
ami bhat khai
I.SUBJ rice.OBJ eat.PRES
Subject Object Verb
I eat rice.

Hajong:

Moi hugre'm re' kha sei.
I guava ACC eat PAST.IND
Subject {} Object {} Verb
I ate the guava.

re is a particle that indicates the accusative case and 'sei' indicates past tense declarative. Here, e is pronounced as the 'i' in 'girl' and 'ei' is pronounced as the 'ay' in 'say'.

Hindi:

मैं सेब {खाता हूँ}
main seb {khaataa hun}
I apple eat.PRES.M
Subject Object Verb
I eat apples.

Marathi:

तो बियाणे पेरतो
Tō biyāṇē pēratō
he seeds sows
Subject Object Verb
He sows seeds.

Nepali:

म किताब पढ्छु
ma kitāb paḍhchhu
I book read.PRES
Subject Object Verb
I read a book.

Odia:

ମୁଁ ଏକ ସେଓ {ଖାଏ}
mun eka seo {khaae}
I an apple eat.PRES.M
Subject {} Object Verb
I eat an apple.

Urdu:

میں نے اسے دیکھا
main ne use dekha
I ERG him/her saw
Subject {} Object Verb
I saw him/her.

This preference is not fixed in all Indo-Aryan languages. Punjabi, for instance, may be characterised as following a Subject—Object—Verb typology overall, but some flexibility is permitted, and this tendency does not follow in sentences involving personal pronouns. Examples are shown here in both Shahmukhi (top, right-to-left) and Gurmukhi (bottom, left-to-right). The word forms used reflect those typical of spoken language. For Shahmukhi, vocalised forms with vowel diacritics have been used to explicitly indicate the forms used; in typical writing these are omitted in most words where regular patterns allow this information to be inferred contextually.

The following sentence exhibits the typical SOV word order tendency. The verb phrase is in retrospective perfect participle form, indicating completion of the action, and takes on the feminine plural suffixes in agreement with the gender and number of the object. The subject here is a masculine plural form; in this context it does not require agreement from the verb.

چاچے چپھّیاں دِتِّیاں گِیاں
ਚਾਚੇ ਜੱਫੀਆਂ {ਦਿੱਤੀਆਂ ਗੀਆਂ}
cāce japphīā̃ {dittīā̃ gīā̃}
{Paternal uncles} hugs {given gone}
Subject Object {Verb Phrase}
The paternal uncles have given hugs.

By contrast, in the following sentence the person involved, referred to by a first-person pronoun, is the object rather than the subject. The significance of people as a semantic category takes precedent over the SOV word order tendency, and the person is typically first even in sentences where that person is the object. The pronoun "mainū̃" has the postposition "nū̃" agglutinated to it, approximately meaning "to." Abstract concepts like desires and emotions typically come "to" people as agentive subjects.

مینُوں سیب چاہِیدا اے
ਮੈਨੂੰ ਸੇਬ ਚਾਹੀਦਾ ਏ
mainū̃ seb {cāhīda} ae
Me-to {apple} desiring exists
Object Subject Verb Copula
I want an apple.

The copula in Punjabi is extraverbal in function. While it can constitute the predicate of a sentence on its own, it does not enter the verb phrase when used alongside a full lexical verb. Instead, it acts as a marker of existence remote to or near to the situation. Some western dialects such as Pothohari have forms of the copula to indicate occurrence of a situation in the future.

However, some Indo-Aryan languages exhibit V2 word order in combination with SOV, most prominently Kashmiri. The non-finite verb (infinitive or participle) remains in final position, but the finite (i.e. inflected) part of the verb appears in second position. Simple verbs look like SVO, whereas auxiliated verbs are discontinuous and adhere to this pattern:

کور چہے ثونٹہ کہیوان
kuur chhi tsũũţh khyevaan
girl is apples eating
Subject Auxiliary Object Verb
The girl is eating apples.

Given that Kashmiri is a V2 language, if the word tsũũţh 'apple' comes first then the subject kuur 'girl' must follow the auxiliary chhi 'is': tsũũţh chhi kuur khyevaan [Lit. "Apples is girl eating."]

Also, the word order changes depending on whether the phrase is in a main clause or in certain kinds of dependent clause. For instance, in relative clauses, the word order is SOVAux:

Main clause + Subordinate Clause	میے ان سوہ کور یوس ثونٹہ کہیوان چہے								
Transcription	=>	mye	eny	swa kuur	=>	ywas	tsũũţh	khyevaan	chhi
Gloss	=>	I	brought	that girl	=>	who	apples	eating	is
Parts	Main clause =>	Subject	Verb	Object	Relative clause =>	Subject	Object	Verb	Auxiliary
Translation	I brought the girl who is eating apples.								

==== Iranian languages ====
The Iranian languages almost uniformly exhibit SOV word order:

Kurdish (Kurmanji):

Ez xwarin dixwim
I food eat
Subject Object Verb
I eat food.

Kurdish (Sorani):

من خواردن دەخۆم
I food eat
Subject Object Verb
I eat food.

Ossetian:

Алан чиныг кæсы
Alan činyg kæsy
Alan book reads
Subject Object Verb
Alan reads a book.

Pashto:

زۀ کار کوم
Zə kaar kawəm
Subject Object Verb
I do the work.

Persian:

من سیب می‌خورم
man sib mikhoram
I apple eat.1.PRES
Subject Object Verb
I am eating an apple.

Talysh:

Merd kitob handedə
Man book reading
Subject Object Verb
The man is reading a book.

The Zaza language usually uses a subject–object-verb structure, but it sometimes uses subject-verb-object too.

O ey kırışeno
He it carries
Subject Object Verb
He carries it.

==== Italic languages ====
===== Latin =====
Classical Latin was an inflected language and had a very flexible word order and sentence structure, but the most usual word order in formal prose was SOV.

Servus puellam amat
Slave.NOM girl.ACC loves
Subject Object Verb
The slave loves the girl.

Again, there are multiple valid translations (such as "a slave") that do not affect the overall analysis.

===== Romance languages =====
Although their common ancestor Latin had free word order and preferred SOV, the modern Romance languages lost the Latin declension that enabled free word order and in general require subject-verb-object structures. However, remnants of SOV remain, particularly the clitic object pronouns common in Romance grammar. For instance, in French:

Nous les-avons.
We them/those-have
Subject Object-Verb
We have those/them

And Portuguese:

Todos aqui te amam
Everybody here you.PRCL love
Subject {} Object Verb
Everybody here loves you.

Aquilo me entristeceu
It/that me.PRCL saddened
Subject Object Verb
It saddened me.

And in Spanish:

Yo lo como
I it eat
Subject Object Verb
I eat it

Contrast this with the SVO structure of a sentence with an explicit object (again in Spanish):

Yo como tortillas
I eat tortillas
Subject Verb Object
I eat tortillas

The SOV tendency can also be seen when using auxiliary verbs, e.g. in Italian:

Io lo sto mangiando
I it am eating
Subject Object Auxiliary Verb
I am eating it

SOV also appears in Portuguese using a temporal adverb, optionally with the negative:

Nós já [não] os temos
We already [not] them.MASC have
Subject {} {} Object Verb
(Positive) We already have them.
(Negative) We do not have them anymore.

Nós ainda [não] os temos
We still [not] them.MASC have
Subject {} {} Object Verb
(Positive) We still have them.
(Negative) We do not have them yet.

And in a suffix construction for the future and conditional tenses:

Eu fá-lo-ei amanhã
I do-it-will tomorrow
Subject Object Verb
I will do it tomorrow.

SVO form: Eu hei-de fazê-lo amanhã or eu farei o mesmo amanhã

=== Japanese ===
The basic principle in Japanese word order is that modifiers come before what they modify. For example, in the sentence "こんな夢を見た。" (Konna yume o mita), the direct object "こんな夢" (this sort of dream) modifies the verb "見た" (saw, or in this case had). Beyond this, the order of the elements in a sentence is relatively free. However, because the topic/subject is typically found in sentence-initial position and the verb is typically in sentence-final position, Japanese is considered an SOV language.

ジョン は 台所 で 本 を 読み ました。
Jon wa daidokoro de hon o yomi mashita
John TOP kitchen LOC book ACC read {POL.PAST}
Subject {} {} {} Object {} Verb {}
John read a book in the kitchen.

A closely related quality of the language is that it is broadly head-final.

=== Korean ===
내–가 상자–를 열–ㄴ–다.
Nae-ga sangja-reul yeonda.
I-SBJ box-OBJ open-PRES-IND
Subject Object Verb
I open the box.

–가/–이 -ga/-i is a particle that indicates the subject. –를/–을 -(r)eul is a particle that indicates the object. 나 na "I" is changed to 내– nae- before –가 -ga, and the verb stem 열– yeol- is changed to 여– yeo- before –ㄴ다 -nda.

=== Mongolian ===
{Би ном уншив.} {} {}
Би ном уншив
Bi nom unshiv
I {a book} read
Subject Object Verb
I read a book.

=== Quechua ===
Quechuan languages have standard SOV word order. The following example is from Bolivian Quechua.

Ñuqa-qa papa-ta mikhu-rqa-ni
I-TOP potato-ACC eat-PAST-1SG
Subject Object Verb
I ate potatoes.

=== Sino-Tibetan languages ===
SOV is believed to have been the "default" order of the protolanguage of the Sino-Tibetan family. Most Sino-Tibetan languages exhibit SOV order; however, the largest sub-branch of the family, the Sinitic or Chinese languages, are uniformly SVO, with some SOV-derived features.

==== Burmese ====
Burmese is an analytic language.

ငါ က ရေသန့်ဘူး ကို ဖွင့် တယ်
ŋà ɡa̰ {seʔkù bú} ɡò pʰwìɴ dè
nga ga. {se'ku bu:} gou hpwin. de
I SUBJ {water bottle} OBJ open PRES
Subject {} Object {} Verb {}
I open the water bottle.

==== Chinese ====
Generally, Chinese varieties all feature SVO word order. However, especially in Standard Mandarin, SOV is tolerated as well. There is even a special particle 把 (bǎ) used to form an SOV sentence.

The following example that uses 把 is controversially labelled as SOV. 把 may be interpreted as a verb, meaning "to hold". However, it does not mean to hold something literally or physically. Rather, the object is held figuratively, and then another verb is acted on the object.

SOV structure is widely used in railway contact in order to clarify the objective of the order.

我 把 蘋果 吃了.
Wǒ bǎ píngguǒ chīle.
I {sign for moving object before the verb} apple ate
Subject Sign Object Verb
I ate the apple. (The apple we were talking about earlier)

==== Meitei ====
ꯑꯩ ꯐꯨꯠꯕꯣꯜ ꯁꯥꯅꯩ
Ei football sanei
I football play
Subject Object Verb
I play football.

==== Yi ====
ꉢ ꌧꅪ ꋠ
nga syp-hni zze.
I {(an) apple} {(to) eat}
Subject Object Verb
I eat an apple.

=== Tungusic languages ===
The Tungusic languages exhibit SOV word order by default.

==== Evenki ====
Бэе бэеткэнмэ ичэрэн.
Beje bejetkenme ičeren
man boy-ACC see-NFUT-3SG
Subject Object Verb
The man saw the boy.

==== Manchu ====
Sentence	ᠪᡳ ᠪᡠᡩᠠ ᠪᡝ ᠵᡝᠮᠪᡳ
Gloss	ᠪᡳ ᠪᡠᡩᠠ ᠪᡝ ᠵᡝᠮᠪᡳ bi buda be jembi I meal ACC eat Subject Object {} Verb; I eat a meal.

=== Turkic languages ===
The Turkic languages all exhibit flexibility in word order, so any order is possible. However, the SOV order is the "default" one that does not connote particular emphasis on any part of the sentence; alternate orders are possible, but are used for emphasis. For instance, in Turkish, the following is the "default" way of saying "Murat ate the apple":

Murat elmayı yedi
Murat apple ate
Subject Object Verb
Murat ate the apple.

However, this sentence could also be constructed as OSV (Elmayı Murat yedi.), OVS (Elmayı yedi Murat.), VSO (Yedi Murat elmayı.), VOS (Yedi elmayı Murat.), or SVO (Murat yedi elmayı.), to indicate the relative importance of the subject, object, or the verb.

Similarly, in Uzbek this SOV sentence is neutral:

Anvar Xivaga ketdi.
Anvar.NOM {to Khiva.DAT} went
Subject Object Verb
Anvar went to Khiva.

(The marker "ga" is a dative case marker for the object that precedes it.)

But the sentence can be changed into OSV as well ("Xivaga Anvar ketdi") to change the emphasis ("It was Anvar who went to Khiva").

The same holds in Kazakh, where the below is neutral:

Дастан кітап оқыды
Dastan kitap oqıdı
Dastan book {read-PST}
Subject Object Verb
Dastan read a book.

But an OSV sentence (кітапты Дастан оқыды; it was Dastan who read the book) can be used to change the emphasis.

Other examples of SOV sentences in Turkic:

Azerbaijani:

Ümid ağac əkəcək
Umid tree {plant-FUT}
Subject Object Verb
Umid will plant a tree.

Kyrgyz:

Биз алма жедик
Biz alma jedik
We apple {eat-PST-1PL}
Subject Object Verb
We ate an apple.

=== Uralic languages ===
The "idealized" profile of the Uralic languages has subject–verb–object word order. However, some Uralic languages, including the Samoyedic languages, some Sámi languages and Hungarian, exhibit SOV.

The protolanguage of the Uralic language family is understood to have exhibited SOV order.

==== Hungarian ====
Hungarian word order is free, although the meaning slightly changes. Almost all permutations of the following sample are valid, but with stress on different parts of the meaning.

Pista kenyeret szeletel
Pista bread.ACC slices
Subject Object Verb
Pista slices bread.

==== Southern Sámi ====
Manne gajpem åastam
I {hat-ACC} buy.1SG
Subject Object Verb
I buy the hat.

==== Udmurt ====
Мoн книгa лыӟӥськo
Mon kńiga lydźiśko
I {a book} {to read}
Subject Object Verb
I am reading a book.

=== Zarma ===
Hama na mo ŋwa
Hama COMP rice eat
Subject {} Object Verb
Hama ate rice.

== See also ==
- Topic-prominent language
- Subject–verb–object
- Object–subject–verb
- Object–verb–subject
- Verb–object–subject
- Verb–subject–object
- Category:Subject–object–verb languages
