= Marker (linguistics) =

Free or bound morpheme

In linguistics, a marker is a free or bound morpheme that indicates the grammatical function of the marked word, phrase, or sentence. Most characteristically, markers occur as clitics or inflectional affixes. In analytic languages and agglutinative languages, markers are generally easily differentiated. In fusional languages and polysynthetic languages, this is often not the case. For example, in Latin, a highly fusional language, the word amō ("I love") is marked by suffix -ō for indicative mood, active voice, first person, singular, present tense. Analytic languages tend to have a relatively limited number of markers.

Markers should be distinguished from the linguistic concept of markedness. An unmarked form is the basic "neutral" form of a word, typically used as its dictionary lemma, such as—in English—for nouns the singular (e.g. cat versus cats), and for verbs the infinitive (e.g. to eat versus eats, ate and eaten). Unmarked forms (e.g. the nominative case in many languages) tend to be less likely to have markers, but this is not true for all languages (compare Latin). Conversely, a marked form may happen to have a zero affix, like the genitive plural of some nouns in Russian (e.g. сапо́г). In some languages, the same forms of a marker have multiple functions, such as when used in different cases or declensions (for example -īs in Latin).

== See also ==
=== Related topics ===
- Affix
- Lexeme
- Morpheme
- Markedness
- Lemma (morphology)
- Null morpheme
- Uninflected word

=== Types of marking ===
- Dependent-marking language
- Head-marking language
- Double-marking language
- Zero-marking language
