= Isolating language =

Language with a very low morpheme per word ratio

An isolating language is a type of language with a morpheme per word ratio close to one, and with no inflectional morphology whatsoever. In the extreme case, each word contains a single morpheme. Examples of widely spoken isolating languages are Yoruba in West Africa and Vietnamese (especially its colloquial register) in Southeast Asia.

A closely related concept is that of an analytic language, which uses unbound morphemes or syntactical constructions to indicate grammatical relationships. Isolating and analytic languages tend to overlap in linguistic scholarship.

Isolating languages contrast with synthetic languages, also called inflectional languages, where words often consist of multiple morphemes. Synthetic languages are subdivided into the classifications fusional, agglutinative, and polysynthetic, which are based on how the morphemes are combined.

== Explanation ==
Although historically, languages were divided into three basic types (isolating, inflectional, agglutinative), the traditional morphological types can be categorized by two distinct parameters:

- morpheme per word ratio (how many morphemes there are per word)
- degree of fusion between morphemes (how separable the inflectional morphemes of words are according to units of meaning represented)

A language is said to be more isolating than another if it has a lower morpheme per word ratio.

To illustrate the relationship between words and morphemes, the English term "city" is a single word, consisting of only one morpheme (city). This word has a 1:1 morpheme per word ratio. In contrast, "handshakes" is a single word consisting of three morphemes (hand, shake, -s). This word has a 3:1 morpheme per word ratio. On average, words in English have a morpheme per word ratio substantially greater than one.

It is perfectly possible for a language to have one inflectional morpheme yet more than one unit of meaning. For example, the Russian word vídyat/видят "they see" has a morpheme per word ratio of 2:1 since it has two morphemes. The root vid-/вид- conveys the imperfective aspect meaning, and the inflectional morpheme -yat/-ят inflects for four units of meaning (third-person subject, plural subject, present/future tense, indicative mood). Effectively, it has four units of meaning in one inseparable morpheme: -yat/-ят.

Languages with a higher tendency toward isolation generally exhibit a morpheme-per-word ratio close to 1:1. In an ideal isolating language, visible morphology would be entirely absent, as words would lack any internal structure in terms of smaller, meaningful units called morphemes. Such a language would not use bound morphemes like affixes.

The morpheme-to-word ratio operates on a spectrum, ranging from lower ratios that skew toward the isolating end to higher ratios on the synthetic end of the scale. A larger overall ratio suggests that a language leans more toward being synthetic rather than isolating.

== Examples ==
Some isolating languages include:

- Classical Chinese
- Vietnamese
- Yoruba
- Igbo
- Khmer language
- Thai language
- Central Flores languages
- Malay trade and creole languages of Eastern Indonesia, including:
  - Ambonese Malay
  - Kupang Malay
  - Larantuka Malay
  - Manado Malay
  - North Moluccan Malay
  - Papuan Malay

== See also ==
- Analytic language
- Free morpheme
- Linguistic typology
- Synthetic language
- Zero-marking language
