= Synthetic language =

Type of language morphology

A synthetic language is a language that is characterized by denoting syntactic relationships between words via inflection or agglutination. Synthetic languages are statistically characterized by a higher morpheme-to-word ratio relative to analytic languages.

Two divisions are fusional languages which favor inflection and agglutinative languages which favor agglutination. Further divisions include polysynthetic languages (most belonging to an agglutinative-polysynthetic subtype, although Navajo and other Athabaskan languages are often classified as belonging to a fusional subtype) and oligosynthetic languages (only found in constructed languages). In contrast, rule-wise, the analytic languages rely more on auxiliary verbs and word order to denote syntactic relationship between words.

Adding morphemes to a root word is used in inflection to convey a grammatical property of the word, such as denoting a subject or an object. Combining two or more morphemes into one word is used in agglutinating languages, instead. For example, the word fast, if inflectionally combined with -er to form the word faster, remains an adjective, while the word teach derivatively combined with -er to form the word teacher ceases to be a verb. Some linguists consider relational morphology to be a type of derivational morphology, which may complicate the classification.

== Forms of synthesis ==
Derivational and relational morphology represent opposite ends of a spectrum; that is, a single word in a given language may exhibit varying degrees of both of them simultaneously. Similarly, some words may have derivational morphology while others have relational morphology.

=== Derivational synthesis ===
In derivational synthesis, morphemes of different types (nouns, verbs, affixes, etc.) are joined to create new words. That is, in general, the morphemes being combined are more concrete units of meaning. The morphemes being synthesized in the following examples either belong to a particular grammatical class – such as adjectives, nouns, or prepositions – or are affixes that usually have a single form and meaning:

- German

Aufsicht -s- Rat -s- Mitglieder Versammlung
supervision {} council {} members assembly
"The supervisory board's members' meeting"

- This word demonstrates the hierarchical construction of synthetically derived words:

1. Aufsichtsratsmitglieder "[the] supervisory board's + members" + Versammlung "meeting"
  1. Aufsichtsrat "supervisory board" + s (Fugen-s) + Mitglieder "members"
    1. Aufsicht "supervision" + s + Rat "council, board"
      1. auf- "on, up" + Sicht "sight"
    2. Mitglied "member" + -er plural
      1. mit- "co-" + Glied "element, constituent part"
  2. ver- (a verb prefix of variable meaning) + sammeln "to gather" + -ung present participle
- auf-, mit-, -er, ver-, and -ung are all bound morphemes.

- Greek

προ παρ- οξύ τόν -ησις
pro par oxý tón -esis
pre {next to} sharp pitch/tone tendency
"Tendency to accent on the proparoxytone [third-to-last] position"

- Polish

przystań -ek
harbor DIM
"Public transportation stop [without facilities]" (i.e. bus stop, tram stop, or rail halt)—compare to dworzec.

- English

anti- dis- establish -ment -arian -ism
against ending {to institute} NS advocate ideology
"the movement to prevent revoking the Church of England's status as the official church [of England, Ireland, and Wales]."

- English word chains such as child labour law may count as well, because it is merely an orthographic convention to write them as isolated words. Grammatically and phonetically they behave like one word (stress on the first syllable, plural morpheme at the end).

- Russian

досто примечательн -ость
dosto primečátelʹn -ostʹ
deserving notable NS
"Place of interest"

- Persian

نواز ــ‌نده ــ‌گی
navâz -ande -gi
{play music} -ing NS
"musicianship" or "playing a musical instrument"

- Ukrainian

на вз до гін
na vz do hin
{direction/intent} {adjective} {approach} {fast movement}
"after something or someone that is moving away"

- international classical compounds based on Greek and Latin

hyper- cholesterol -emia
high cholesterol blood
the presence of high levels of cholesterol in the blood.

- alternately, cholesterol can be read as chole- + στερεός(stereós) + -ol, as in "bile + solid + [alcohol suffix]", or "the solid alcohol present in bile".

=== Relational synthesis ===
In relational synthesis, root words are joined to bound morphemes to show grammatical function. In other words, it involves the combination of more abstract units of meaning than derivational synthesis. In the following examples many of the morphemes are related to voice (e.g. passive voice), whether a word is in the subject or object of the sentence, possession, plurality, or other abstract distinctions in a language:

- Italian

comunic -ando ve le
communicate GER you.PL those.FEM.PL
"Communicating those[feminine plural] to you[plural]"

- Spanish

escrib iéndo me lo
write GER me it
"Writing it to me"

- Estonian

raske-sti kasvata-tav
heavy-ADVR educate-PTCP.PRES.PASS
"difficultly-educatable" ("difficult to educate")

- Catalan

an -em -se/-nos -en/'n
go we ourselves from
"Let's get out of here"

- Nahuatl

ō c ā lti zquiya
PAST 3SG-OBJ water CAUS IRR
"She would have bathed him"

- Latin

com prim unt ur
together crush they PASS
"They are crushed together"

- Albanian
  - jepmani
    - "give + to me + it[singular] + you[plural] + [imperative mood]"
    - 'You, give it to me'
- Japanese

見 させ られ がたい
mi sase rare gatai
see CAUS PASS difficult
"It's difficult to be shown [this]"

- Finnish

juosta -ella -isin -ko -han
run FREQ I.COND Q CAS
"I wonder if I should run around [aimlessly]"

- Hungarian

ház -a -i -tok -ban
house POSS PL your.PL in
"In your houses"

szeret -lek
love {I REFL you}
"I love you"

- Turkish

Afyonkarahisar -lı -laş -tır -ama (y) -abil -ecek -ler -imiz -den misiniz?
Afyonkarahisar {citizen of} transform PASS notbe (thematic) able FUT PL we among you-PL-FUT-Q
"Are you[plural/formal] amongst the ones whom we might not be able to make citizens of Afyonkarahisar?"

- Georgian

გადმო- გვ- ა- ხტუნ -ებ -ინ -ებ -დ -ნენ -ო
gadmo gv a khtun eb in eb d nen o
"They said that they would be forced by them [the others] to make someone to jump over in this direction." (The word describes the whole sentence that incorporates tense, subject, object, relation between them, direction of the action, conditional and causative markers etc.)

== Types of synthetic languages ==
=== Agglutinating languages ===
Agglutinating languages have a high rate of agglutination in their words and sentences, meaning that the morphological construction of words consists of distinct morphemes that usually carry a single unique meaning. These morphemes tend to look the same no matter what word they are in, so it is easy to separate a word into its individual morphemes. Morphemes may be bound (that is, they must be attached to a word to have meaning, like affixes) or free (they can stand alone and still have meaning).

- Swahili is an agglutinating language. For example, distinct morphemes are used in the verbs' conjugation:
  - Ni-na-soma: I-present-read or I am reading
  - U-na-soma: you-present-read or you are reading
  - A-na-soma: s/he-present-read or s/he is reading

=== Fusional languages ===
Fusional languages are similar to agglutinating languages in that they involve the combination of many distinct morphemes. However, morphemes in fusional languages are often assigned several different lexical meanings, and they tend to be fused together so that it is difficult to separate individual morphemes from one another.

=== Polysynthetic ===
Polysynthetic languages are considered the most synthetic of the three types because they combine multiple stems as well as other morphemes into a single continuous word. These languages often turn nouns into verbs. Many Native Alaskan and other Native American languages are polysynthetic.

- Mohawk: Washakotya'tawitsherahetkvhta'se means "He ruined her dress" (strictly, 'He made the-thing-that-one-puts-on-one's body ugly for her'). This one inflected verb in a polysynthetic language expresses an idea that can only be conveyed using multiple words in a more analytic language such as English.

=== Oligosynthetic ===
Oligosynthetic languages are a theoretical notion created by Benjamin Whorf. Such languages would be functionally synthetic, but make use of a very limited array of morphemes (perhaps just a few hundred). The concept of an oligosynthetic language type was proposed by Whorf to describe the Native American language Nahuatl, although he did not further pursue this idea. Though no natural language uses this process, it has found its use in the world of constructed languages, in auxlangs such as Ygyde and aUI.

== Synthetic and analytic languages ==
Synthetic languages combine (synthesize) multiple concepts into each word. Analytic languages break up (analyze) concepts into separate words. These classifications comprise two ends of a spectrum along which different languages can be classified. The present-day English is seen as analytic, but it used to be fusional. Certain synthetic qualities (as in the inflection of verbs to show tense) were retained.

The distinction is, therefore, a matter of degree. The most analytic languages, isolating languages, consistently have one morpheme per word, while at the other extreme, in polysynthetic languages such as some Native American languages a single inflected verb may contain as much information as an entire English sentence.

In order to demonstrate the nature of the isolating-analytic–synthetic–polysynthetic classification as a "continuum", some examples are shown below.

=== Isolating ===
- Mandarin lacks inflectional morphology almost entirely, and most words consist of either one- or two-syllable morphemes, especially due to the very numerous compound words.

| Chinese text | 明天 | 我 | 的 | 朋友 | 会 | 为 | 我 | 做 | 生日 | 蛋糕 |
| Transliteration | míngtiān | wǒ | de | péngyou | huì | wèi | wǒ | zuò | shēngrì | dàngāo |
| Literal translation | dawn day | I | of | friend friend | will | for | I | make | birth day | egg cake |
| Meaning | tomorrow | I | (genitive particle(='s)) | friend | will | for | I | make | birthday | cake |
"Tomorrow my friend(s) will make a birthday cake for me."

However, with rare exceptions, each syllable in Mandarin (corresponding to a single written character) represents a morpheme with an identifiable meaning, even if many of such morphemes are bound. This gives rise to the common misconception that Chinese consists exclusively of "words of one syllable". As the sentence above illustrates, however, even simple Chinese words such as míngtiān 'tomorrow' (míng "next" + tīan "day") and péngyou 'friend' (a compound of péng and yǒu, both of which mean 'friend') are synthetic compound words.

The Chinese language of the classic works (of Confucius for example) and southern dialects to a certain extent is more strictly monosyllabic: each character represents one word. The evolution of modern Mandarin Chinese was accompanied by a reduction in the total number of phonemes. Words which previously were phonetically distinct became homophones. Many disyllabic words in modern Mandarin are the result of joining two related words (such as péngyou, literally "friend-friend") in order to resolve the phonetic ambiguity. A similar process is observed in some English dialects. For instance, in the Southern dialects of American English, it is not unusual for the short vowel sounds [ɪ] and [ɛ] to be indistinguishable before nasal consonants: thus the words "pen" and "pin" are homophones (see pin-pen merger). In these dialects, the ambiguity is often resolved by using the compounds "ink-pen" and "stick-pin", in order to clarify which "p*n" is being discussed.

=== Analytic ===
- English:
  - "He travelled by hovercraft on the sea" is largely isolating, but travelled (although it is possible to say "did travel" instead) and hovercraft each have two morphemes per word, the former being an example of relational synthesis (inflection), and the latter of compounding synthesis (a special case of derivation with another free morpheme instead of a bound one).

=== Rather synthetic ===
- Japanese:
  - 私たちにとって、この泣く子供の写真は見せられがたいものです。 Watashitachi ni totte, kono naku kodomo no shashin wa miseraregatai mono desu means strictly literally, 'To us, these photos of a child crying are things that are difficult to be shown', meaning "We cannot bear being shown these photos of a child crying" in more idiomatic English. In the example, most words have more than one morpheme and some have up to five.
- Hebrew:
  - אתמול סיפרתי לחברים שלי על הרעיון, שעליו חשבתי Etmol siparti l'khaverim sheli al hara'ayon, she'alav khashavti. this sentence means "Yesterday I told my friends about the idea I was thinking about". From this example we can see that Hebrew verbs are conjugated by tense/mood and person (including gender and number). In addition, there are prepositions that are also conjugated, but by person, like של shel and על al. More at: Modern Hebrew grammar.

Comparison between English and Hebrew (this table should be read right-to-left)
| חשב/תי | ש/על/יו | ה/רעיון | על | של/י | ל/חבר/ים | סיפר/תי | אתמול |
| I thought | that about it | the idea | about | my | to friends | I told | Yesterday |

- Bulgarian:
  - Селото, селото, пустото селото откак заселено. Seloto, seloto, pustoto seloto, otkak zaseleno. this sentence means "That village, that particular village, that village has always been empty ever since it was settled". From this example we can see that Bulgarian nouns are inflected by definiteness, gender, number. Bulgarian verbs are conjugated by tense, mood, person, gender, number, and evidential marking. Bulgarian is a fusional inflecting language with some analyticity (including prepositions in the nominal morphology, and some analytical-synthetic tenses in the verbal morphology).

Comparison between English and Bulgarian (this table should be read left-to-right)
| Селото | селото | пустото | селото | откак | заселено |
| That village | that particular village | has always been empty | that village | ever since | it was settled |

The definite articles are not only suffixes but are also noun inflections expressing thought in a synthetic manner.

=== Very synthetic ===
- Finnish:
  - Käyttäytyessään tottelemattomasti oppilas saa jälki-istuntoa
  - "Should they behave in an insubordinate manner, the student will get detention."
  - Structurally: behaviour (present/future tense) (of their) obey (without) (in the manner/style) studying (they who (should be)) gets detention (some). Practically every word is derived and/or inflected. However, this is quite formal language, and (especially in speech) would have various words replaced by more analytic structures: Kun oppilas käyttäytyy tottelemattomasti, hän saa jälki-istuntoa meaning 'When the student behaves in an insubordinate manner, they will get detention'.
- Georgian:
  - გადმოგვახტუნებინებდნენო gadmogvakht'unebinebdneno (gadmo-gv-a-kht'un-eb-in-eb-d-nen-o)
  - "They said that they would be forced by them (the others) to make someone to jump over in this direction".
  - The word describes the whole sentence that incorporates tense, subject, direct and indirect objects, their plurality, relation between them, direction of the action, conditional and causative markers, etc.
- Classical Arabic:
  - أو أعطيناكموه عبثًا؟ 'aw a'aʼṭaynākumūhu ʻabathan (aw aʻṭay-nā-ku-mū-hu ʻabath-an)
  - "Or had we given it [unto] you (plural, masculine) futilely ?" in Arabic, each word consists of one root that has a basic meaning (aʻṭā 'give' and ʻabath 'futile'). Prefixes and suffixes are added to make the word incorporate subject, direct and indirect objects, number, gender, definiteness, etc.

Comparison between Classical Arabic and English
| أو | أعطيناكموه | عبثًا |
| aw | aʻṭay-nā-ku-mū-hu | ʻabath-an |
| Or | given - we had - [unto] you - it | futilely |

== Increase in analyticity ==
Haspelmath and Michaelis observed that analyticity is increasing in a number of European languages. In the German example, the first phrase makes use of inflection, but the second phrase uses a preposition. The development of preposition suggests the moving from synthetic to analytic.

des Hauses
the.GEN.SG house.GEN.SG
'the house's'

von dem Haus
of the.DAT.SG house.DAT.SG
'of the house'

It has been argued that analytic grammatical structures are easier for adults learning a foreign language. Consequently, a larger proportion of non-native speakers learning a language over the course of its historical development may lead to a simpler morphology, as the preferences of adult learners get passed on to second generation native speakers. This is especially noticeable in the grammar of creole languages. A 2010 paper in PLOS ONE suggests that evidence for this hypothesis can be seen in correlations between morphological complexity and factors such as the number of speakers of a language, geographic spread, and the degree of inter-linguistic contact.

According to Ghil'ad Zuckermann, Modern Hebrew (which he calls "Israeli") "is much more analytic, both with nouns and verbs", compared with Classical Hebrew (which he calls "Hebrew").

== See also ==
- Analytic language
- Bound morpheme
- Isolating language
- Linguistic typology
- Morphological derivation
- Morphology (linguistics)
