= Verb–object word order =

Word order in which the verb comes before the object

Verb–object word order (VO) is a word order where the verb typically comes before the object. About 53% of documented languages have this order.

For example, Japanese would be considered an OV language, and English would be considered to be VO. A basic sentence demonstrating this would be as follows.

Japanese: Inu ga neko (object) o oikaketa (verb)
English: The dog chased (verb) the cat (object)

Winfred P. Lehmann is the first to propose the reduction of the six possible permutations of word order to just two main ones, VO and OV, in what he calls the Fundamental Principle of Placement (FPP), arguing that the subject is not a primary element of a sentence. VO languages are primarily right-branching, or head-initial: heads are generally found at the beginning of their phrases.

VO languages have a tendency to favor the use of prepositions instead of postpositions, with only 42 using postpositions of the documented 498 VO languages.

Some languages, such as Finnish, Hungarian, Russian, Turkish and Yiddish, use both VO and OV constructions, but in other instances, such as Early Middle English, some dialects may use VO and others OV. Languages that contain both OV and VO constructions may solidify into one or the other construction in the course of their historical development. A language that moves the verb or verb phrase more than the object will have surface VO word order, and a language that moves the object more than the verb or verb phrase will have surface OV word order.

== Subsets ==
- Subject–verb–object
- Verb–subject–object
- Verb–object–subject
