= Analytic language =

Language whose grammar rarely uses word inflection

An analytic language is a type of natural language that uses affixes very rarely but in which a series of root/stem words is accompanied by prepositions, postpositions, particles and modifiers. This is opposed to synthetic languages, which synthesize many concepts into a single word, using affixes regularly.

In an analytic language, syntactic roles are assigned to words primarily by word order. For example, in English, the sentences "the cat caught the fish" and "the fish caught the cat" have different meanings, expressed by different word orders. This can be contrasted with a synthetic language such as Latin, in which the same difference in meaning can be expressed by changing the individual words while keeping the same word order: "fēlis piscem cēpit" means 'the cat caught the fish', while "fēlem piscis cēpit" means 'the fish caught the cat'.

Typically, analytic languages have a low morpheme-per-word ratio, especially with respect to inflectional morphemes.

No natural language, however, is purely analytic or purely synthetic.

== Background ==
The term analytic is commonly used in a relative rather than an absolute sense. The most prominent and widely used Indo-European analytic language is Modern English, which over the centuries has lost much of the inflectional morphology that it inherited from Proto-Indo-European, Proto-Germanic and Old English and has not gained any new inflectional morphemes in the meantime, which makes it more analytic than most other Indo-European languages.

For example, Proto-Indo-European had much more complex grammatical conjugation, grammatical genders, and dual number; it also had inflections for eight or nine cases in its nouns, pronouns, adjectives, numerals, participles, postpositions and determiners. Standard English has lost nearly all of these inflected forms (except for three modified cases for pronouns) and grammatical gender and dual number, and has simplified its conjugation.

Greek, Latin, German and a majority of the Slavic languages, including Russian, are synthetic languages, characterized by free word order. Nouns in Russian inflect for at least six cases, most of which descended from Proto-Indo-European cases, whose functions English expresses instead by other strategies like prepositions, verbal voice, word order and possessive 's.

Modern Hebrew is more analytic than Classical Hebrew, particularly in its treatment of nouns. Classical Hebrew relies heavily on inflectional morphology to convey grammatical relationships, while in Modern Hebrew there has been a significant reduction of the use of inflectional morphology.

== Isolating language ==
A related concept is that of isolating languages, which are those with a low morpheme-per-word ratio (taking into account derivational morphemes as well). Purely isolating languages are by definition analytic and lack inflectional morphemes. However, the reverse is not necessarily true, and a language can have derivational morphemes but lack inflectional morphemes. For example, Mandarin Chinese has many compound words, which gives it a moderately high ratio of morphemes per word, but since it has almost no inflectional affixes at all to convey grammatical relationships, it is a very analytic language.

English is not totally analytic in its nouns, since it uses inflections for number (e.g., "one day, three days"; "one boy, four boys") and possession ("The boy's ball" vis-à-vis "The boy has a ball"). Mandarin Chinese, by contrast, has no inflections on its nouns: Compare 一天 yī tiān 'one day', 三天 sān tiān 'three days' (literally 'three day'); 一個男孩 yī ge nánhái 'one boy' (lit. 'one [entity of] male child'), 四個男孩 sì ge nánhái 'four boys' (lit. 'four [entity of] male child'). However, English is considered weakly inflected, and comparatively more analytic than most other Indo-European languages.

Persian is a synthetic language, not an analytical one, since it has some features of agglutination, making use of prefixes and suffixes attached to the stems of verbs and nouns. It is also an SOV language (its typical word order is subject, followed by object, and then verb), thus having a head-final phrase structure. For example, Persian Kuchiktarinhayeshunra barnemigardundam means 'I wouldn’t return the smallest ones of them' (literally 'Small+diminutive+comparative+superlative+plural+possessive+object_marker re+not+ing+turn+to+did+I').

== List of analytic languages ==
Synthetic languages that encounter heavy influence, or become creolized, often become more analytic, as the complex rules of synthesis break down. Thus, many of these languages are like English or Mandarin in being significant admixtures of more than one language (with English, these languages include Old English, Norman French, Latin and Old Norse); or are new languages made from earlier ones, like Haitian Creole.

- Indo-European languages
  - Germanic languages
    - Afrikaans
    - Danish
    - Dutch (partially)
    - English (mostly)
    - Norwegian
    - Swedish
  - Others
    - Bulgarian (partially)
    - French (partially)
    - Haitian Creole
    - Kalto
- Austronesian languages
  - Cham
  - Hawaiian
  - Māori
- Sino-Tibetan languages
  - Burmese
  - Sinitic languages
    - Classical Chinese
      - Cantonese
      - Mandarin
- Austroasiatic languages
  - Khmer
  - Vietnamese
- Kra-Dai languages
  - Lao
  - Thai
- Hmong-Mien languages
  - Hmong
- Maybrat
- Mixtec
- Sango
- Yoruba

== See also ==
- Auxiliary verb
- Free morpheme
- Isolating language
- Zero-marking language
- Synthetic language
- Linguistic typology
