= Double-marking language =

A double-marking language is one in which the grammatical marks showing relations between different constituents of a phrase tend to be placed on both the heads (or nuclei) of the phrase in question, and on the modifiers or dependents. Pervasive double-marking is rather rare, but instances of double-marking occur in many languages.

For example, in Turkish, in a genitive construction involving two definite nouns, both the possessor and the possessed are marked, the former with a suffix marking the possessor (and corresponding to a possessive adjective in English) and the latter in the genitive case. For example, 'brother' is kardeş, and 'dog' is köpek, but 'brother's dog' is kardeşin köpeği. (The consonant change is part of a regular consonant lenition.)

Another example is a language in which endings that mark gender or case are used to indicate the role of both nouns and their associated modifiers (such as adjectives) in a sentence (such as Russian and Spanish) or in which case endings are supplemented by verb endings marking the subject, direct object and/or indirect object of a sentence.

Proto-Indo-European had double-marking in both verb phrases (verbs were marked for person and number, nominals for case) and noun-adjective phrases (both marked with the same case-and-number endings) but not in possessive phrases (only the dependent was marked).

== See also ==
- Dependent-marking language
- Head-marking language
- Zero-marking language
