= Dependent-marking language =

Classification of natural languages

A dependent-marking language has grammatical markers of agreement and case government between the words of phrases that tend to appear more on dependents than on heads. The distinction between head-marking and dependent-marking was first explored by Johanna Nichols in 1986, and has since become a central criterion in language typology in which languages are classified according to whether they are more head-marking or dependent-marking. Many languages employ both head and dependent-marking, but some employ double-marking, and yet others employ zero-marking. However, it is not clear that the head of a clause has anything to do with the head of a noun phrase, or even what the head of a clause is.

== In English ==
English has few inflectional markers of agreement and so can be construed as zero-marking much of the time. Dependent-marking, however, occurs when a singular or plural noun demands the singular or plural form of the demonstrative determiner this/these or that/those and when a verb or preposition demands the subject or object form of a personal pronoun: I/me, he/him, she/her, they/them, who/whom. The following representations of dependency grammar illustrate some cases:

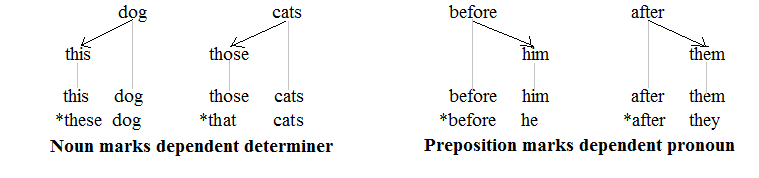

Plural nouns in English require the plural form of a dependent demonstrative determiner, and prepositions require the object form of a dependent personal pronoun.

== In German ==
Such instances of dependent-marking are a relatively rare occurrence in English, but dependent-marking occurs much more frequently in related languages, such as German. There, for instance, dependent-marking is present in most noun phrases. A noun marks its dependent determiner:

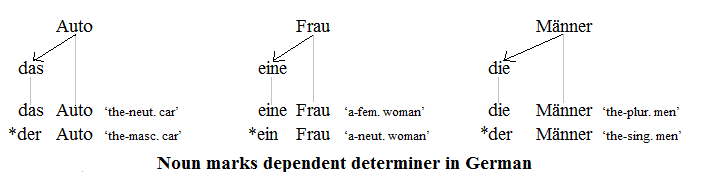

The noun marks the dependent determiner in gender (masculine, feminine, or neuter) and number (singular or plural). In other words, the gender and number of the noun determine the form of the determiner that must appear. Nouns in German also mark their dependent adjectives in gender and number, but the markings vary across determiners and adjectives. Also, a head noun in German can mark a dependent noun with the genitive case.

== See also ==
- Constituent (linguistics)
- Dependency grammar
- Double-marking language
- Head (linguistics)
- Head-marking language
- Zero-marking language

== Sources ==
- Ágel, V., L. Eichinger, H.-W. Eroms, P. Hellwig, H. Heringer, and H. Lobin (eds.) 2003/6. Dependency and valency: An international handbook of contemporary research. Berlin: Walter de Gruyter.
- Nichols, J. 1986. Head-marking and dependent-marking grammar. Language 62, 1, 56-119.
- Nichols, J. 1992. Linguistic diversity in space and time. Chicago: University of Chicago Press.
