= Yoda (disambiguation) =

Yoda is a character in the Star Wars media franchise.

Yoda can also refer to:

== People ==
=== Arts and entertainment ===
- Jun'ichi Yoda, Japanese poet
- Yoshio Yoda, Japanese actor
- Yoshikata Yoda, Japanese screenwriter
- Yuichi Yoda, Japanese footballer
- Yūki Yoda, Japanese idol and actress
- DJ Yoda, British turntablist

=== Sports and games ===
- Karim Yoda, French footballer
- Ikuko Yoda (依田 郁子; 1938–1983), Japanese sprinter
- Mitsumasa Yoda, Japanese footballer
- Norimoto Yoda, professional Go player
- Greg Somerville, New Zealand rugby union player

=== Other fields ===
- Alain Bedouma Yoda, politician from Burkina Faso
- Céline Yoda, politician from Burkina Faso
- Tom Yoda, Japanese businessman

== Entertainment ==
- "Yoda" (song), by Weird Al Yankovic
- Yoda: Dark Rendezvous, a 2004 Star Wars novel
- Sergeant Daniel "Yoda" Dean, a character in NYC 22

== Other uses ==
- Yoda, an organised crime group in Marseille, France; see Organized crime in France
- Yoda conditions, which describe a computer's programming style
- Yoda Press, an Indian book publisher
- YODA Project, an open data project for clinical research
- Yoda (acorn worm), a genus of acorn worms in the family Torquaratoridae

== See also ==
- Yudh (disambiguation)
- Yoddha (disambiguation)
  - Yoddha (comics), a comic book character published by Raj Comics
- Yodo River, Japan
- Yoder
- Yotta-
