= Jodha =

Jodha may refer to:

- Jodha of Mandore (1416–1489), ruler of Mandore and founder of Jodhpur
- Jodha Bai (disambiguation)
  - Jodha Bai, the popular misnomer of Mariam-uz-Zamani, chief consort of Mughal Emperor Akbar
  - Jodh Bai, Empress consort of Mughal Emperor Jahangir and a direct descendant of Jodha of Mandore
- Jodha and Jagroop, folktale from Rajasthan, India
- Jodhaa Akbar, a 2008 Bollywood film about Mariam-uz-Zamani and Akbar
- Jodha Akbar (TV series), an Indian TV series about Mariam-uz-Zamani and Akbar

== See also ==
- Yoddha (disambiguation)
- Jodhpur (disambiguation)
