= Circassian tenses =

In the Circassian languages—comprising the Adyghe (West Circassian) and Kabardian (East Circassian) branches—the verbal system is highly polysynthetic and heavily agglutinative. The expression of time, continuity, and reality is governed by a complex system of verb tenses that are intricately bound to grammatical aspect and mood.

Unlike Indo-European languages where tense is often a standalone inflection, Circassian verbs utilize a vast array of suffixes to encode exact temporal nuances. Both Adyghe and Kabardian distinguish fundamentally between past, present, and future events, but they further divide these categories based on aspectual features such as completion (perfective versus imperfective), habituality, and temporal distance (recent past versus distant past).

While the two branches share a common morphological ancestor and exhibit similar verbal templates, their specific tense markers have diverged. For example, future tenses in both varieties are split into "definite" and "indefinite" forms, but the phonetic realizations of these suffixes differ notably between Adyghe and Kabardian. Because the Circassian verb can incorporate multiple arguments (subject, direct object, and indirect objects) as prefixes, the tense and aspect suffixes placed at the end of the verb complex serve to ground the entire multipersonal action in time.

== Overview ==
Tense	Ady.		Kbd.		Meaning
Tense	Suffix	Example	Suffix	Example	Meaning
Present	~∅	макӀо [maːkʷʼa]	~∅	макӀуэ [maːkʷʼa]	(s)he is going; (s)he goes
Simple past	~агъэ / ~гъ(э)	кӀуагъ [kʷʼaːʁ]	~ащ [~aːɕ]	кӀуащ [kʷʼaːɕ]	(s)he went
Discontinuous past	~гъагъ [~ʁaːʁ]	кӀогъагъ [kʷʼaʁaːʁ]	~ат [~aːt]	кӀуат [kʷʼaːt]	(s)he went (but is not there anymore)
Pluperfect	~гъагъ [~ʁaːʁ]	кӀогъагъ [kʷʼaʁaːʁ]	~ат [~aːt]	кӀуат [kʷʼaːt]	(s)he had gone
Remote past	~гъагъ [~ʁaːʁ]	кӀогъагъ [kʷʼaʁaːʁ]	~ат [~aːt] / ~гъащ [~ʁaːɕ]	кӀуат [kʷʼaːt] / кӀуэгъащ [kʷʼaʁaːɕ]	(s)he went back then / a long time ago
Past of the distant past (remote pluperfect)	~гъагъ [~ʁaːʁ]	кӀогъагъ [kʷʼaʁaːʁ]	~гъат [~ʁaːt]	кӀуэгъат [kʷʼaʁaːt]	(s)he had gone a long time ago
Categorical future	~н [~n]	кӀон [kʷʼan]	~нщ [~nɕ]	кӀуэнщ [kʷʼanɕ]	(s)he will go
Factual future	~щт [~ɕt]	кӀощт [kʷʼaɕt]	~нущ [~nəwɕ]	кӀуэнущ [kʷʼanəwɕ]	(s)he will go; (s)he is about to go
Imperfect	~щтыгъ [~ɕtəʁ]	кӀощтыгъ [kʷʼaɕtəʁ]	~(р)т [~(r)t]	кӀуэ(р)т [kʷʼa(r)t]	(s)he was going; (s)he used to go
Conditional perfect	~щтыгъ [~ɕtəʁ]	кӀощтыгъ [kʷʼaɕtəʁ]	~нт [~nt] / ~нут [~nəwt]	кӀуэнт [kʷʼant] / кӀуэнут [kʷʼanəwt]	(s)he would have gone
Future perfect	~гъэщт [~ʁaɕt]	кӀуагъэщт [kʷʼaːʁaɕt]	~гъахэнущ	кӀуэгъахэнущ	(s)he will have gone
Recent past	~гъакӀ [~ʁaːt͡ʃʼ]	кӀогъакӀ [kʷʼaʁaːt͡ʃʼ]	—	—	(s)he just (recently) went
Realization (complication)	~гъах [~ʁaːx]	кӀогъах [kʷʼaʁaːx]	~гъэхэщ / ~кӀэщ	кӀуагъэхэщ [kʷʼaːʁaxaɕ]	(s)he has already gone

== Present tense ==
In the Circassian languages, the present tense is characterized by two primary morphological features:

- The dynamic prefix: Descending from the Proto-Circassian prefix *уэ-, this surfaces as the vowel -э- in Adyghe and as the prefix -о- in Kabardian. This prefix is added only to positive present dynamic forms. It is entirely absent in non-present tenses (such as the past and future) and in non-positive present forms (such as the negative present or present forms marked with a mood).
- The dynamic suffix: Descending from the Proto-Circassian suffix *-р, this underlying marker surfaces as -р when followed by other suffixes. However, in modern Adyghe and Kabardian, it becomes silent (drops to ~∅) when it is the absolute final character in a verb. This phonological dropping is comparable to how the final "r" is not pronounced in non-rhotic English dialects (for example, pronouncing car as cah or water as watah).

Present-tense marker
Language	Marker (prefixed)	Suffix	Example
Ady.	positive dynamic ~э~, positive 3rd person мэ~	~р (non-final), ~∅ (word-final)	матхэ "(s)he writes" сэтхэ "I write"
Kbd.	positive dynamic о~, positive 3rd person мэ~	~р (non-final), ~∅ (word-final)	матхэ "(s)he writes" сотхэ "I write"

Present tense (positive / negative) — Adyghe ~э, Kabardian ~о
Person	Language	Monovalent intransitive лэжьэн (to work)	Bivalent intransitive еджэн (to read)	Bivalent transitive лъэгъун / лъагъун (to see)
1st sg. (I)	Ady.	сэлажьэ слажьэрэп	седжэ седжэрэп	сэлъэгъу слъэгъурэп
1st sg. (I)	Kbd.	солажьэ сылажьэркъым	соджэ седжэркъым	солъагъу слъагъуркъым
2nd sg. (you)	Ady.	олажьэ улажьэрэп	уеджэ уеджэрэп	олъэгъу плъэгъурэп
2nd sg. (you)	Kbd.	уолажьэ улажьэркъым	уоджэ уеджэркъым	уолъагъу плъагъуркъым
3rd sg. (he/she)	Ady.	мэлажьэ лажьэрэп	еджэ еджэрэп	елъэгъу ылъэгъурэп
3rd sg. (he/she)	Kbd.	мэлажьэ лажьэркъым	йоджэ еджэркъым	елъагъу илъагъуркъым
1st pl. (we)	Ady.	тэлажьэ тлажьэрэп	теджэ теджэрэп	тэлъэгъу тлъэгъурэп
1st pl. (we)	Kbd.	долажьэ дылажьэркъым	доджэ деджэркъым	долъагъу длъагъуркъым
2nd pl. (you all)	Ady.	шъолажьэ шъулажьэрэп	шъуеджэ шъуеджэрэп	шъолъэгъу шъулъэгъурэп
2nd pl. (you all)	Kbd.	фолажьэ фылажьэркъым	фоджэ феджэркъым	фолъагъу флъагъуркъым
3rd pl. (they)	Ady.	мэлажьэх лажьэхэрэп	еджэх еджэхэрэп	алъэгъу алъэгъурэп
3rd pl. (they)	Kbd.	мэлажьэх лажьэхэркъым	йоджэх еджэхэркъым	ялъагъу ялъагъуркъым

Furthermore, in modern spoken Kabardian, the dynamic suffix -р is increasingly being dropped even when it is not in the absolute word-final position, particularly before the negative suffix -къым. This results in the loss of the -р- sound in everyday speech, as demonstrated in the table below:

Dropping of dynamic suffix -р in Modern Kabardian
Meaning	Standard Kabardian	Modern Kabardian
I am not going	сыкӀуэркъым	сыкӀуэкъым
(S)he is not going	кӀуэркъым	кӀуэкъым
I do not see (it)	слъагъуркъым	слъагъукъым
(S)he does not see (it)	илъагъуркъым	илъагъукъым

The present tense covers both the simple present (habitual actions, general facts) and the present continuous (actions in progress at the moment of speaking). The intended reading is determined by context.

The dual habitual/continuous reading of the present is illustrated below:

Ady.	Kbd.	Meaning
Сэлажьэ	Сэ солажьэ	"I work" (I am currently employed / have a job) OR "I am working" (right now).
Сэ тутын сешъо	Сэ тутын софэ	"I smoke" (a habit) OR "I am smoking right now".
Сэ кола сешъорэп	Сэ кола сефэркъым	"I do not drink cola" (habitually) OR "I am not drinking cola" (right now).
Сэ щэджагъом Ӏофым сыщэшхэ, унэм сыщышхэрэп	Сэ шэджагъуэм лэжьапӀэм сыщошхэ, унэм сыщышхэркъым	"At noon I eat at work, I do not eat at home." (A habitual routine.)
Сэ Ӏофым сыщэшхыныр сикӀасэп, унэм скӀожьымэ сэшхэжьы	Сэ лэжьапӀэм сыщышхэныр сигу ирихьыркъым, унэм сыкӀуэжмэ сошхэж	"I don't like eating at work; when I go home, I eat." (A contrasting habitual routine.)

=== Dynamic prefix and suffix ===
Each table below adds a Proto-Circassian column, with dashes marking the morpheme boundaries. Because the negative endings -эп / -къым did not yet exist in Proto-Circassian, its negative instead used the older negative prefix *-мы-, placed in the slot the dynamic prefix *уэ- would otherwise fill and still followed by the dynamic suffix *-р (e.g. "(s)he does not go" *∅-мы-кӀуэ-р). This *-мы- is distinct from the positive third-person мэ-, the mutated dynamic prefix.

The position of the dynamic prefix depends on the verb's valency and transitivity. Adyghe is highly regular, inserting -э- immediately before the root across all valencies; Kabardian -о- occupies the same slot but frequently blends with — or is "swallowed" by — adjacent vowels. Each table below pairs the positive present (top of every cell) with the negative present (bottom): the dynamic prefix is present in the positive but absent in the negative, while the dynamic suffix -р — silent word-finally in the positive — resurfaces before the negative ending.

==== Disappearance of the dynamic prefix ====
The dynamic prefix strictly marks the positive present tense. It surfaces only when all three of the following conditions hold at once: the verb is in the present tense, it is positive, and it carries no mood marker. If any one of these conditions fails — that is, if the verb is shifted to a non-present tense (such as the past or future), made negative, or marked for a mood (such as the conditional) — the dynamic prefix drops out entirely. Adyghe -э- and its Kabardian counterpart -о- simply vanish, leaving the personal prefix (such as сы-) or its bare consonant (such as с-) to attach directly to the root.

The contrast is most easily seen by holding the verb root constant and changing only the grammatical context. The table below tracks "to go" through seven contexts in both the 1st person singular (where the personal prefix and the dynamic prefix fuse, Adyghe с-э- → сэ-, Kabardian с-о- → со-) and the 3rd person singular (where the null personal prefix forces the dynamic prefix to surface word-initially as мэ-; see below). Note that the potential/ability suffix (Adyghe -шъу / Kabardian -ф) and the repetitive/return suffix (Adyghe -жьы / Kabardian -ж) are not mood markers and leave the verb in the positive present, so the dynamic prefix is retained alongside them.

Retention vs. dropping of the dynamic prefix ("to go"), 1st sg. and 3rd sg.
Grammatical context	1st sg. ("I go")		3rd sg. ("(s)he goes")	
Grammatical context	Adyghe	Kabardian	Adyghe	Kabardian
Present positive (prefix active)	сэкӀо с-э-кӀо	сокӀуэ с-о-кӀуэ	мэкӀо мэ-кӀо	мэкӀуэ мэ-кӀуэ
Present + potential (prefix retained)	сэкӀошъу с-э-кӀо-шъу	сокӀуэф с-о-кӀуэ-ф	мэкӀошъу мэ-кӀо-шъу	мэкӀуэф мэ-кӀуэ-ф
Present + repetitive (prefix retained)	сэкӀожьы с-э-кӀо-жьы	сокӀуэж с-о-кӀуэ-ж	мэкӀожьы мэ-кӀо-жьы	мэкӀуэж мэ-кӀуэ-ж
Past positive (prefix drops)	скӀуагъ с-кӀу-агъ	скӀуащ с-кӀу-ащ	кӀуагъ ∅-кӀу-агъ	кӀуащ ∅-кӀу-ащ
Future positive (prefix drops)	скӀощт с-кӀо-щт	скӀуэнущ с-кӀу-энущ	кӀощт ∅-кӀо-щт	кӀуэнущ ∅-кӀу-энущ
Present negative (prefix drops)	сыкӀорэп сы-кӀо-рэп	сыкӀуэркъым сы-кӀуэ-р-къым	кӀорэп ∅-кӀо-рэп	кӀуэркъым ∅-кӀуэ-р-къым
Conditional (prefix drops)	сыкӀомэ сы-кӀо-мэ	сыкӀуэмэ сы-кӀуэ-мэ	кӀомэ ∅-кӀо-мэ	кӀуэмэ ∅-кӀуэ-мэ

As the table shows, once the verb leaves the positive present tense the dynamic vowel vanishes completely in both persons. In the 1st singular this forces the base personal prefix (сы-) or its bare consonant (с-) to attach directly to the root; in the 3rd singular, where the dynamic prefix had been carrying the whole syllable as мэ-, its loss leaves only the bare root with a null prefix.

==== Monovalent intransitive verbs and the мэ- mutation ====
Monovalent (intransitive) verbs take a single (subject) argument, and the dynamic element sits between the subject prefix and the root. When a personal subject prefix precedes it, the vowels blend: in Adyghe уэ is written as о therefore something like шъуэ is written as шъо, while in Kabardian the prefixes fuse with -о- to give со-, уо-, до-, фо-.

Monovalent intransitive present ("to go"), positive / negative
Person	Adyghe		Kabardian		Proto-Circassian (pos / neg)
Person	Form	Underlying	Form	Underlying	Proto-Circassian (pos / neg)
1st sg.	сэкӀо сыкӀорэп	с-э-кӀо сы-кӀо-р-эп	сокӀуэ сыкӀуэркъым	с-о-кӀуэ сы-кӀуэ-р-къым	*сы-уэ-кӀуэ-р *сы-мы-кӀуэ-р
2nd sg.	окӀо укӀорэп	у-э-кӀо у-кӀо-р-эп	уокӀуэ укӀуэркъым	у-о-кӀуэ у-кӀуэ-р-къым	*уы-уэ-кӀуэ-р *уы-мы-кӀуэ-р
3rd sg.	макӀо кӀорэп	э-кӀо → мэ-кӀо кӀо-р-эп	макӀуэ кӀуэркъым	о-кӀуэ → мэ-кӀуэ кӀуэ-р-къым	*∅-уэ-кӀуэ-р *∅-мы-кӀуэ-р
1st pl.	тэкӀо тыкӀорэп	т-э-кӀо ты-кӀо-р-эп	докӀуэ дыкӀуэркъым	д-о-кӀуэ ды-кӀуэ-р-къым	*ды-уэ-кӀуэ-р *ды-мы-кӀуэ-р
2nd pl.	шъокӀо шъукӀорэп	шъу-э-кӀо шъу-кӀо-р-эп	фокӀуэ фыкӀуэркъым	ф-о-кӀуэ фы-кӀуэ-р-къым	*шъуы-уэ-кӀуэ-р *шъуы-мы-кӀуэ-р
3rd pl.	макӀох кӀохэрэп	э-кӀо-х → мэ-кӀо-х кӀо-хэ-р-эп	макӀуэ(х) кӀуэхэркъым	о-кӀуэ(-х) → мэ-кӀуэ(-х) кӀуэ-хэ-р-къым	*∅-уэ-кӀуэ-хэ-р *∅-мы-кӀуэ-хэ-р

In the third person there is no overt personal prefix (it is a null prefix ∅-), so the dynamic element would stand word-initially. Because it cannot open a word as a bare vowel, both Adyghe -э- and Kabardian -о- mutate into мэ- (e.g. Kabardian ∅-о-кӀуэ → макӀуэ, surfacing as ма- before the root for phonetic reasons). In short, whenever the dynamic prefix is the first element of the verb, with no prefix before it, it surfaces as мэ-.

However, if another prefix—such as the cislocative (directional) prefix къ-—is added, the dynamic element is no longer the initiator, and the mutation does not occur. For example:

- In Adyghe, э-кӀо mutates to макӀо ("he goes"), but with the cislocative prefix, къ-э-кӀо surfaces normally as къэкӀо ("he comes").
- In Kabardian, о-кӀуэ mutates to макӀуэ ("he goes"), but with the cislocative prefix, къ-о-кӀуэ surfaces normally as къокӀуэ ("he comes").

Crucially, мэ- is not an independent third-person pronoun but the dynamic element in disguise. It therefore obeys the same dropping rule as the prefix it stands for, vanishing in the past, future, negative, and conditional. This is why forms such as *макӀорэп (negative), *мэкӀуагъ (past), or *макӀомэ (conditional) do not exist: once the dynamic element drops, the third-person verb reverts to its bare root — the negative is simply кӀорэп / кӀуэркъым, as the third row of the table above shows (see Disappearance of the dynamic prefix).

==== Bivalent intransitive verbs ====
Bivalent intransitive verbs take an absolutive subject and an oblique indirect object. Here the dynamic element is no longer word-initial, so it never mutates to мэ-; it slots in directly before the root, and in Kabardian it blends with adjacent vowels.

Bivalent intransitive present ("to look at"), positive / negative
Meaning	Adyghe		Kabardian		Proto-Circassian (pos / neg)
Meaning	Form	Underlying	Form	Underlying	Proto-Circassian (pos / neg)
1 → 3 "I look at him"	сеплъы сеплъырэп	сы-й-э-плъы сы-й-плъы-р-эп	соплъ сеплъыркъым	сы-й-о-плъ сы-й-плъы-р-къым	*сы-йэ-уэ-плъы-р *сы-йэ-мы-плъы-р
2 → 3 "you look at him"	уеплъы уеплъырэп	уы-й-э-плъы уы-й-плъы-р-эп	уоплъ уеплъыркъым	уы-й-о-плъ уы-й-плъы-р-къым	*уы-йэ-уэ-плъы-р *уы-йэ-мы-плъы-р
3 → 3 "(s)he looks at him"	еплъы еплъырэп	∅-й-э-плъы ∅-й-плъы-р-эп	йоплъ еплъыркъым	∅-й-о-плъ ∅-й-плъы-р-къым	*∅-йэ-уэ-плъы-р *∅-йэ-мы-плъы-р
1 → 2 "I look at you"	сыоплъы сыоплъырэп	с-у-э-плъы с-у-плъы-р-эп	сыноплъ сыноплъыркъым	сы-ны-у-о-плъ сы-ны-у-плъы-р-къым	*сы-уы-уэ-плъы-р *сы-уы-мы-плъы-р
2 → 1 "you look at me"	укъысэплъы укъысэплъырэп	уы-къы-сы-э-плъы уы-къы-сы-плъы-р-эп	укъызоплъ укъызэплъыркъым	уы-къы-зы-о-плъ уы-къы-зы-плъы-р-къым	*уы-къы-сы-уэ-плъы-р *уы-къы-сы-мы-плъы-р
3 → 1 "(s)he looks at me"	къысэплъы къысэплъырэп	∅-къы-сы-э-плъы ∅-къы-сы-плъы-р-эп	къызоплъ къызэплъыркъым	∅-къы-зы-о-плъ ∅-къы-зы-плъы-р-къым	*∅-къы-сы-уэ-плъы-р *∅-къы-сы-мы-плъы-р
3 → 2 "(s)he looks at you"	къыоплъы къыоплъырэп	∅-къы-уы-э-плъы ∅-къы-уы-плъы-р-эп	къоплъ къуэплъыркъым	∅-къы-уы-о-плъ ∅-къы-уы-плъы-р-къым	*∅-къы-уы-уэ-плъы-р *∅-къы-уы-мы-плъы-р

Taken together these forms cover every argument combination: the dynamic element keeps its slot directly before the root in every positive form, blending with adjacent vowels in Kabardian, and drops in the negative (where the suffix -р resurfaces). The "I look at you" row also highlights a structural difference between the languages: Kabardian inserts a relational element ны- (the translocative н-) that Adyghe lacks, yet the dynamic element occupies the same slot before the root in both (and Proto-Circassian shows it directly before the root, without ны-). That slot is preserved even when locational or directional prefixes — such as the къы- that opens the bottom three rows — are stacked before the root: for instance Kabardian "I look among them" is сахоплъэ (сы-а-х-о-плъэ), with -о- still immediately preceding the root; Adyghe builds the equivalent in the same way.

==== Bivalent transitive verbs ====
In bivalent transitive verbs the subject is ergative and the direct object absolutive; the dynamic element follows the ergative subject marker. As elsewhere, it appears only in the positive present; the negative drops it, so the ergative pronoun clusters directly against the root while the suffix -р resurfaces before the negative ending:

Bivalent transitive present ("to see"), positive / negative
Meaning	Adyghe		Kabardian		Proto-Circassian (pos / neg)
Meaning	Form	Underlying	Form	Underlying	Proto-Circassian (pos / neg)
1 → 3 "I see him"	сэлъэгъу слъэгъурэп	∅-с-э-лъэгъу ∅-с-лъэгъу-р-эп	солъагъу слъагъуркъым	∅-с-о-лъагъу ∅-с-лъагъу-р-къым	*∅-сы-уэ-лъагъу-р *∅-сы-мы-лъагъу-р
2 → 3 "you see him"	олъэгъу плъэгъурэп	∅-уы-э-лъэгъу ∅-п-лъэгъу-р-эп	уолъагъу плъагъуркъым	∅-уы-о-лъагъу ∅-п-лъагъу-р-къым	*∅-уы-уэ-лъагъу-р *∅-уы-мы-лъагъу-р
1 → 2 "I see you"	усэлъэгъу услъэгъурэп	у-с-э-лъэгъу у-с-лъэгъу-р-эп	узолъагъу услъагъуркъым	у-с-о-лъагъу у-с-лъагъу-р-къым	*у-сы-уэ-лъагъу-р *у-сы-мы-лъагъу-р
2 → 1 "you see me"	сыолъэгъу сыплъэгъурэп	сы-уы-э-лъэгъу сы-п-лъэгъу-р-эп	сыболъагъу сыплъагъуркъым	сы-бы-о-лъагъу сы-п-лъагъу-р-къым	*сы-уы-уэ-лъагъу-р *сы-уы-мы-лъагъу-р
3 → 1 "(s)he sees me"	селъэгъу сылъэгъурэп	сы-∅-э-лъэгъу сы-∅-лъэгъу-р-эп	селъагъу сылъагъуркъым	сы-∅-о-лъагъу сы-∅-лъагъу-р-къым	*сы-∅-уэ-лъагъу-р *сы-∅-мы-лъагъу-р
3 → 2 "(s)he sees you"	уелъэгъу улъэгъурэп	уы-∅-э-лъэгъу уы-∅-лъэгъу-р-эп	уелъагъу улъагъуркъым	уы-∅-о-лъагъу уы-∅-лъагъу-р-къым	*уы-∅-уэ-лъагъу-р *уы-∅-мы-лъагъу-р
3 → 3 "(s)he sees him"	елъэгъу ылъэгъурэп	∅-ы→е-лъэгъу ∅-ы-лъэгъу-р-эп	елъагъу илъагъуркъым	∅-и-о-лъагъу ∅-и-лъагъу-р-къым	*∅-йы-уэ-лъагъу-р *∅-йы-мы-лъагъу-р
3pl → 3 "they see him"	алъэгъу алъэгъурэп	∅-а-лъэгъу ∅-а-лъэгъу-р-эп	ялъагъу ялъагъуркъым	∅-я-лъагъу ∅-я-лъагъу-р-къым	*∅-я-уэ-лъагъу-р *∅-я-мы-лъагъу-р

In the third person the dynamic element fuses with the ergative pronoun in the positive present: Adyghe ы- surfaces as е-, and Kabardian -о- is swallowed into е-. The negative, having no dynamic element, exposes the bare ergative base — compare positive елъэгъу / елъагъу "(s)he sees it" with negative ылъэгъурэп / илъагъуркъым, where ы- / и- reappears. Unlike bivalent intransitives, transitive verbs distinguish singular from plural ergative subjects, and the dynamic element is absorbed into both in the positive present: Adyghe е- (sg.) vs а- (pl.); Kabardian е- (sg., from ∅-и-о-) vs я- (pl., from ∅-я-о-). The intransitive "to read it", by contrast, keeps its prefix throughout (еджэ / йоджэ).

The same number distinction carries over to plural absolutive objects (e.g. Kabardian "(s)he sees the books" елъагъухэ, "they see the book" ялъагъу), with the dynamic element still swallowed in the positive present.

==== Trivalent verbs ====
Trivalent verbs take an ergative subject, an absolutive direct object, and an oblique indirect object. The dynamic element still secures the slot immediately before the root, fusing with the ergative pronoun; in the negative it drops out and the suffix -р resurfaces:

Trivalent present ("to give it"), positive / negative
Meaning	Adyghe		Kabardian		Proto-Circassian (pos / neg)
Meaning	Form	Underlying	Form	Underlying	Proto-Circassian (pos / neg)
1 → 3 "I give it to him"	есэты естырэп	∅-йэ-с-э-ты ∅-йэ-с-ты-р-эп	изот естыркъым	∅-и-с-о-т ∅-и-с-ты-р-къым	*∅-йэ-сы-уэ-ты-р *∅-йэ-сы-мы-ты-р
2 → 3 "you give it to him"	еоты ептырэп	∅-йэ-уы-э-ты ∅-йэ-п-ты-р-эп	ибот ептыркъым	∅-и-бы-о-т ∅-и-п-ты-р-къым	*∅-йэ-уы-уэ-ты-р *∅-йэ-уы-мы-ты-р
3 → 3 "(s)he gives it to him"	реты ритырэп	∅-йэ-ы→ры-э-ты ∅-йэ-ры-ты-р-эп	ирет иритыркъым	∅-и-ры-о-т ∅-и-ры-ты-р-къым	*∅-йэ-йы-уэ-ты-р *∅-йэ-йы-мы-ты-р
1 → 2 "I give it to you"	къыосэты къыостырэп	къы-о-с-э-ты къы-о-с-ты-р-эп	узот уэстыркъым	∅-у-с-о-т ∅-у-с-ты-р-къым	*уы-сы-уэ-ты-р *уы-сы-мы-ты-р
2 → 1 "you give it to me"	къысэоты къысэптырэп	къы-сы-уы-э-ты къы-сы-п-ты-р-эп	къызыбот къызэптыркъым	къы-зы-бы-о-т къы-зы-п-ты-р-къым	*къы-сы-уы-уэ-ты-р *къы-сы-уы-мы-ты-р
3 → 1 "(s)he gives it to me"	къысеты къыситырэп	къы-сы-ы→е-ты къы-сы-ы-ты-р-эп	къызет къызитыркъым	къы-зы-и-о-т къы-зы-и-ты-р-къым	*къы-сы-йы-уэ-ты-р *къы-сы-йы-мы-ты-р
3 → 2 "(s)he gives it to you"	къыуеты къыуитырэп	къы-уы-ы→е-ты къы-уы-ы-ты-р-эп	къыует къыуитыркъым	къы-уы-и-о-т къы-уы-и-ты-р-къым	*къы-уы-йы-уэ-ты-р *къы-уы-йы-мы-ты-р

These rows cover the full range of trivalent combinations. As in the bivalent paradigms, the dynamic element holds its slot immediately before the root in the positive present, fusing with the ergative pronoun, and drops in the negative so that the suffix -р resurfaces and the pronoun clusters directly against the root. When the indirect object is a first or second person acted upon from a higher or equal source, the directional prefix къ(ы)- / къ(ы)- appears at the front of the word (the bottom four rows), but it sits outside the dynamic slot and does not disturb it.

== Future tense ==
Both languages distinguish a factual future and a categorical future.

The factual future is indicated by the suffix ~щт in Adyghe and ~нущ in Kabardian. This functions as a "Simple Future" that states a concrete plan or a highly certain fact about the future.

The categorical future, formed with ~н in Adyghe and ~нщ in Kabardian, carries a slightly weaker degree of certainty, often translating to "will/may".

Future-tense suffixes
Type	Ady.	Kbd.	Example (Ady. / Kbd.)
Factual future	~щт [~ɕt]	~нущ [~nəwɕ]	кӀощт / кӀуэнущ "(s)he will go"
Categorical future	~н [~n]	~нщ [~nɕ]	кӀон / кӀуэнщ "(s)he will go"

Note on verb stems: For bivalent transitive verbs like Kabardian лъагъун, the root vowel changes from 'а' to 'э' (лъэгъу-) when followed by future suffixes.

Factual Future Tense (Positive / Negative) — Adyghe ~щт, Kabardian ~нущ
Person	Language	Monovalent Intransitive лэжьэн (to work)	Bivalent Intransitive еджэн (to read)	Bivalent Transitive лъэгъун / лъагъун (to see)
1st Sg. (I)	Ady.	сылэжьэщт сылэжьэщтэп	седжэщт седжэщтэп	слъэгъущт слъэгъущтэп
1st Sg. (I)	Kbd.	сылэжьэнущ сылэжьэнукъым	седжэнущ седжэнукъым	слъэгъунущ слъэгъунукъым
2nd Sg. (You)	Ady.	улэжьэщт улэжьэщтэп	уеджэщт уеджэщтэп	плъэгъущт плъэгъущтэп
2nd Sg. (You)	Kbd.	улэжьэнущ улэжьэнукъым	уеджэнущ уеджэнукъым	плъэгъунущ плъэгъунукъым
3rd Sg. (He/She)	Ady.	лэжьэщт лэжьэщтэп	еджэщт еджэщтэп	ылъэгъущт ылъэгъущтэп
3rd Sg. (He/She)	Kbd.	лэжьэнущ лэжьэнукъым	еджэнущ еджэнукъым	илъэгъунущ илъэгъунукъым
1st Pl. (We)	Ady.	тылэжьэщт тылэжьэщтэп	теджэщт теджэщтэп	тлъэгъущт тлъэгъущтэп
1st Pl. (We)	Kbd.	дылэжьэнущ длэжьэнукъым	деджэнущ деджэнукъым	тлъэгъунущ тлъэгъунукъым
2nd Pl. (You all)	Ady.	шъулэжьэщт шъулэжьэщтэп	шъуеджэщт шъуеджэщтэп	шъулъэгъущт шъулъэгъущтэп
2nd Pl. (You all)	Kbd.	фылэжьэнущ флэжьэнукъым	феджэнущ феджэнукъым	флъэгъунущ флъэгъунукъым
3rd Pl. (They)	Ady.	лэжьэщтых лэжьэщтыхэп	еджэщтых еджэщтыхэп	алъэгъущт алъэгъущтэп
3rd Pl. (They)	Kbd.	лэжьэнухэщ лэжьэнухэкъым	еджэнухэщ еджэнухэкъым	ялъэгъунущ ялъэгъунукъым

The categorical future conjugation is shown below for Kabardian (~нщ). The Adyghe categorical future is formed with ~н (e.g., кӀон "(s)he will go").

Categorical Future Tense ~нщ (Kabardian, Positive / Negative)
Person	Monovalent Intransitive лэжьэн	Bivalent Intransitive еджэн	Bivalent Transitive лъагъун
1st Sg. (I)	сылэжьэнщ сылэжьэнкъым	седжэнщ седжэнкъым	слъэгъунщ слъэгъункъым
2nd Sg. (You)	улэжьэнщ улэжьэнкъым	уеджэнщ уеджэнкъым	плъэгъунщ плъэгъункъым
3rd Sg. (He/She)	лэжьэнщ лэжьэнкъым	еджэнщ еджэнкъым	илъэгъунщ илъэгъункъым
1st Pl. (We)	дылэжьэнщ длэжьэнкъым	деджэнщ деджэнкъым	тлъэгъунщ тлъэгъункъым
2nd Pl. (You all)	фылэжьэнщ флэжьэнкъым	феджэнщ феджэнкъым	флъэгъунщ флъэгъункъым
3rd Pl. (They)	лэжьэнхэщ лэжьэнхэкъым	еджэнхэщ еджэнхэкъым	ялъэгъунщ ялъэгъункъым

== Simple past ==
The simple past describes an action that was completed at a specific point in the past. It is a neutral tense used to establish historical facts, recent events, or a sequential narrative without emphasizing whether the result of the action is still valid today.

Simple-past suffix
Language	Suffix	Example
Ady.	~гъ (also ~агъ / ~ыгъ) [~ʁ]	кӀуагъ [kʷʼaːʁ] "(s)he went"
Kbd.	~ащ [~aːɕ]	кӀуащ [kʷʼaːɕ] "(s)he went"

In Adyghe it is typically formed by adding the suffix -гъ (or -агъ / -ыгъ); in Kabardian by adding the suffix -ащ. The choice of form and the behavior of the final root vowel follow specific morphological rules:

- In Adyghe, verbs ending in -э usually change to -а- before adding the suffix -гъ, while verbs ending in -ы or a consonant typically take the suffix -ыгъ or directly append -гъ.
- In Kabardian, verbs ending in -э or -ы change to -а- before adding the suffix -щ.
- In both languages, dynamic present-tense prefixes (like мэ-, the Adyghe dynamic vowel э or the Kabardian dynamic о-) are completely dropped in the past tense.

Below are examples showing the transition from the present tense to the simple past for various verb valencies and endings.

Verb Type	Language	Present Tense	Simple Past	Translation
Monovalent Intransitive (-э)	Ady.	ар макӀо	ар кӀуагъ	"He goes" → "He went"
Monovalent Intransitive (-э)	Kbd.	ар макӀуэ	ар кӀуащ	"He goes" → "He went"
Monovalent Intransitive	Ady.	ар мэсты	ар стыгъ	"It burns" → "It burned"
Monovalent Intransitive	Kbd.	ар мэс	ар сащ	"It burns" → "It burned"
Bivalent Intransitive	Ady.	ар ащ еплъы	ар ащ еплъыгъ	"He looks at him" → "He looked at him"
Bivalent Intransitive	Kbd.	ар абы йоплъ	ар абы еплъащ	"He looks at him" → "He looked at him"
Bivalent Intransitive (-э)	Ady.	ар ащ хэхьэ	ар ащ хэхьагъ	"He enters [into] it" → "He entered [into] it"
Bivalent Intransitive (-э)	Kbd.	ар абы хохьэ	ар абы хыхьащ	"He enters [into] it" → "He entered [into] it"
Bivalent Transitive	Ady.	ащ ар еукӀы	ащ ар ыукӀыгъ	"He kills him" → "He killed him"
Bivalent Transitive	Kbd.	абы ар еукӀ	абы ар иукӀащ	"He kills him" → "He killed him"
Bivalent Transitive (-э)	Ady.	ащ ар етхьалэ	ащ ар ытхьалагъ	"He drowns him" → "He drowned him"
Bivalent Transitive (-э)	Kbd.	абы ар етхьэлэ	абы ар итхьэлащ	"He drowns him" → "He drowned him"
Trivalent Transitive	Ady.	ащ ар ащ реты	ащ ар ащ ритыгъ	"He gives it to him" → "He gave it to him"
Trivalent Transitive	Kbd.	абы ар абы ирет	абы ар абы иритащ	"He gives it to him" → "He gave it to him"
Trivalent Transitive (-э)	Ady.	ащ ар ащ реӀо	ащ ар ащ риӀуагъ	"He tells it to him" → "He told it to him"
Trivalent Transitive (-э)	Kbd.	абы ар абы жреӀэ	абы ар абы жриӀащ	"He tells it to him" → "He told it to him"
Static Verb	Ady.	ар щыс	ар щысыгъ	"He is sitting" → "He was sitting"
Static Verb	Kbd.	ар щыс	ар щысащ	"He is sitting" → "He was sitting"

=== Simple Past Conjugations ===
Simple Past Tense (Positive / Negative)
Person	Language	Monovalent Intransitive лэжьэн (to work)	Bivalent Intransitive еджэн (to read)	Bivalent Transitive лъэгъун / лъагъун (to see)
1st Sg. (I)	Ady.	сылэжьагъ сылэжьагъэп	седжагъ седжагъэп	слъэгъугъ слъэгъугъэп
1st Sg. (I)	Kbd.	сылэжьащ сылэжьакъым	седжащ седжакъым	слъэгъуащ слъэгъуакъым
2nd Sg. (You)	Ady.	улэжьагъ улэжьагъэп	уеджагъ уеджагъэп	плъэгъугъ плъэгъугъэп
2nd Sg. (You)	Kbd.	улэжьащ улэжьакъым	уеджащ уеджакъым	плъэгъуащ плъэгъуакъым
3rd Sg. (He/She)	Ady.	лэжьагъ лэжьагъэп	еджагъ еджагъэп	ылъэгъугъ ылъэгъугъэп
3rd Sg. (He/She)	Kbd.	лэжьащ лэжьакъым	еджащ еджакъым	илъэгъуащ илъэгъуакъым
1st Pl. (We)	Ady.	тылэжьагъ тылэжьагъэп	теджагъ теджагъэп	тлъэгъугъ тлъэгъугъэп
1st Pl. (We)	Kbd.	дылэжьащ дылэжьакъым	деджащ деджакъым	тлъэгъуащ тлъэгъуакъым
2nd Pl. (You all)	Ady.	шъулэжьагъ шъулэжьагъэп	шъуеджагъ шъуеджагъэп	шъулъэгъугъ шъулъэгъугъэп
2nd Pl. (You all)	Kbd.	фылэжьащ фылэжьакъым	феджащ феджакъым	флъэгъуащ флъэгъуакъым
3rd Pl. (They)	Ady.	лэжьагъэх лэжьагъэхэп	еджагъэх еджагъэхэп	алъэгъугъ алъэгъугъэп
3rd Pl. (They)	Kbd.	лэжьахэщ лэжьахэкъым	еджахэщ еджахэкъым	ялъэгъуащ ялъэгъуакъым

== Pluperfect, discontinuous past and remote past ==
A second past tense is formed by adding the suffix ~гъагъ in Adyghe and ~ат in Kabardian. In addition, Kabardian possesses dedicated remote past forms in ~гъащ and ~гъат, built with the remote past marker -гъа- — the same element seen in the Adyghe suffix ~гъагъ (see below). Unlike the simple past, these tenses highlight the relationship of the action to the present timeline or to other past events. The suffix ~гъагъ / ~ат fundamentally alters the nuance, timeline, and ongoing validity of an action, and covers three distinct (but related) readings, disambiguated by context:

Second-past suffix (pluperfect / discontinuous past / remote past)
Language	Suffix	Example
Ady.	~гъагъ [~ʁaːʁ]	кӀогъагъ [kʷʼaʁaːʁ] "(s)he had gone"
Kbd.	~ат [~aːt]; distant past ~гъащ [~ʁaːɕ], ~гъат [~ʁaːt]	кӀуат [kʷʼaːt] "(s)he had gone"

Pluperfect (past of the past): It designates that "at that specific time, Action X had already happened." It firmly anchors an action prior to an indicated past time frame. This is the only reading that corresponds directly to the English pluperfect ("had done").
Discontinuous Past: It implies that the action was completed, but its result no longer holds true in the present (e.g., "he had come, but he is gone now").
Remote Past: It states a fact situated further back in the past — "back then", "at that time in the past", "a long time ago" — in contrast to the simple past, which tends to be understood as recent. For this last meaning Kabardian also has the dedicated distant past form ~гъащ, described below.

In addition, in both languages the suffix can simply put strong emphasis on the fact that an action was fully accomplished. These three readings are contrasted with the simple past in detail below.

Below are examples showing the transition from the present tense to this tense for various verb valencies and endings. Note that in Adyghe, for many verbs ending in -э, the vowel shifts to -о- or -э- before the suffix.

Verb Type	Language	Present Tense	Pluperfect	Translation
Monovalent Intransitive (-э)	Ady.	ар макӀо	ар кӀогъагъ	"He goes" → "He had gone (but is back)"
Monovalent Intransitive (-э)	Kbd.	ар макӀуэ	ар кӀуат	"He goes" → "He had gone (but is back)"
Monovalent Intransitive	Ady.	ар мэсты	ар стыгъагъ	"It burns" → "It had burned"
Monovalent Intransitive	Kbd.	ар мэс	ар сат	"It burns" → "It had burned"
Bivalent Intransitive	Ady.	ар ащ еплъы	ар ащ еплъыгъагъ	"He looks at him" → "He had looked at him"
Bivalent Intransitive	Kbd.	ар абы йоплъ	ар абы еплъат	"He looks at him" → "He had looked at him"
Bivalent Intransitive (-э)	Ady.	ар ащ хэхьэ	ар ащ хэхьэгъагъ	"He enters [into] it" → "He had entered [into] it"
Bivalent Intransitive (-э)	Kbd.	ар абы хохьэ	ар абы хыхьат	"He enters [into] it" → "He had entered [into] it"
Bivalent Transitive	Ady.	ащ ар еукӀы	ащ ар ыукӀыгъагъ	"He kills him" → "He had killed him"
Bivalent Transitive	Kbd.	абы ар еукӀ	абы ар иукӀат	"He kills him" → "He had killed him"
Bivalent Transitive (-э)	Ady.	ащ ар етхьалэ	ащ ар ытхьалэгъагъ	"He drowns him" → "He had drowned him"
Bivalent Transitive (-э)	Kbd.	абы ар етхьэлэ	абы ар итхьэлат	"He drowns him" → "He had drowned him"
Trivalent Transitive	Ady.	ащ ар ащ реты	ащ ар ащ ритыгъагъ	"He gives it to him" → "He had given it to him"
Trivalent Transitive	Kbd.	абы ар абы ирет	абы ар абы иритат	"He gives it to him" → "He had given it to him"
Trivalent Transitive (-э)	Ady.	ащ ар ащ реӀо	ащ ар ащ риӀогъагъ	"He tells it to him" → "He had told it to him"
Trivalent Transitive (-э)	Kbd.	абы ар абы жреӀэ	абы ар абы жриӀат	"He tells it to him" → "He had told it to him"
Static Verb	Ady.	ар щыс	ар щысэгъагъ	"He is sitting" → "He had been sitting"
Static Verb	Kbd.	ар щыс	ар щысат	"He is sitting" → "He had been sitting"

=== Pluperfect Conjugations ===
Pluperfect Tense (Positive / Negative)
Person	Language	Monovalent Intransitive лэжьэн (to work)	Bivalent Intransitive еджэн (to read)	Bivalent Transitive лъэгъун / лъагъун (to see)
1st Sg. (I)	Ady.	сылэжьэгъагъ сылэжьэгъагъэп	седжэгъагъ седжэгъагъэп	слъэгъугъагъ слъэгъугъагъэп
1st Sg. (I)	Kbd.	сылэжьат сылэжьатэкъым	седжат седжатэкъым	слъэгъуат слъэгъуатэкъым
2nd Sg. (You)	Ady.	улэжьэгъагъ улэжьэгъагъэп	уеджэгъагъ уеджэгъагъэп	плъэгъугъагъ плъэгъугъагъэп
2nd Sg. (You)	Kbd.	улэжьат улэжьатэкъым	уеджат уеджатэкъым	плъэгъуат плъэгъуатэкъым
3rd Sg. (He/She)	Ady.	лэжьэгъагъ лэжьэгъагъэп	еджэгъагъ еджэгъагъэп	ылъэгъугъагъ ылъэгъугъагъэп
3rd Sg. (He/She)	Kbd.	лэжьат лэжьатэкъым	еджат еджатэкъым	илъэгъуат илъэгъуатэкъым
1st Pl. (We)	Ady.	тылэжьэгъагъ тылэжьэгъагъэп	теджэгъагъ теджэгъагъэп	тлъэгъугъагъ тлъэгъугъагъэп
1st Pl. (We)	Kbd.	дылэжьат дылэжьатэкъым	деджат деджатэкъым	тлъэгъуат тлъэгъуатэкъым
2nd Pl. (You all)	Ady.	шъулэжьэгъагъ шъулэжьэгъагъэп	шъуеджэгъагъ шъуеджэгъагъэп	шъулъэгъугъагъ шъулъэгъугъагъэп
2nd Pl. (You all)	Kbd.	фылэжьат фылэжьатэкъым	феджат феджатэкъым	флъэгъуат флъэгъуатэкъым
3rd Pl. (They)	Ady.	лэжьэгъагъэх лэжьэгъагъэхэп	еджэгъагъэх еджэгъагъэхэп	алъэгъугъагъ алъэгъугъагъэп
3rd Pl. (They)	Kbd.	лэжьахэт лэжьахэтэкъым	еджахэт еджахэтэкъым	ялъэгъуат ялъэгъуатэкъым

=== Simple Past vs. Pluperfect, Discontinuous Past and Remote Past ===
The simple past (~гъ / ~ащ) and the second past (~гъагъ / ~ат) divide the labor of talking about the past. The simple past is the neutral, default choice; the second past adds one of three more specific meanings. Only the first of these — the true pluperfect — can be translated with the English pluperfect ("had done"). The discontinuous past and the remote past have no dedicated English equivalent: English must fall back on the simple past, with the extra nuance carried by context or adverbs ("back then", "at that time", "long ago"), or left entirely implicit.

==== 1. Pluperfect (past of the past, relative timeline) ====
When establishing a sequence of events in the past, ~гъагъ / ~ат indicates that an action was already completed by the time another event occurred. Conversely, the simple past ~гъ / ~ащ usually signifies that the action happened when or after the secondary event occurred. This is the reading that matches the English pluperfect: it requires a second, later reference point in the past ("the wife arrived", "the exam date came"), and the verb in ~гъагъ / ~ат is anchored before that point.

Tense	Ady.	Kbd.	Meaning	Explanation
Pluperfect	ЛӀыр дэкӀыгъагъ ишъуз унэм къызэсыжьым.	ЛӀыр дэкӀат и щхьэгъусэр унэм къыщыкӀуэжым.	The man had gone out when his wife arrived home.	By the time the wife came home, the man was already out.
Simple Past	ЛӀыр дэкӀыгъ ишъуз унэм къызэсыжьым.	ЛӀыр дэкӀащ и щхьэгъусэр унэм къыщыкӀуэжым.	The man went out when his wife arrived home.	When the wife arrived home, only then, the man went out.
Pluperfect	Сылэжьэгъагъ пшъашъэр къызэсэщэм.	Сылэжьат пщащэр къыщысщэжым.	I had worked when I married the girl.	I already worked before I married the girl.
Simple Past	Сылэжьагъ пшъашъэр къызэсэщэм.	Сылэжьащ пщащэр къыщысщэжым.	I worked when I married the girl.	I married the girl and then worked.
Pluperfect	Экзамыныр къызэсым седжэгъагъ.	Экзаменыр къыщысым седжат.	I had studied when the exam date arrived.	By the point the exam date arrived, I was already done studying for it.
Simple Past	Экзамыныр къызэсым седжагъ.	Экзаменыр къыщысым седжащ.	I studied when the exam date arrived.	Only after the exam date arrived, I started studying.

==== 2. Discontinuous Past (reversed or cancelled results) ====
The "discontinuous" reading of ~гъагъ / ~ат describes a past state or action whose results are no longer true in the present: the action was completed, but the outcome has since been reversed, undone, or has simply ceased to hold. Using the simple past ~гъ / ~ащ instead implies that the result of the past action is still valid or ongoing.

This reading often cannot be rendered by any single English tense. English sometimes approximates it with the simple past of a state: Америкэм сыщыӀэгъагъ (Adyghe) / Америкэм сыщыӀат (Kabardian) is best translated "I was in America" — with the implication, exactly as in English, that I am no longer there. But a sentence like Псы къэсхьыгъагъ / Псы къэсхьат has no direct English equivalent: it means "I brought water (back then)" with the added implication that the water is no longer available. Translating it as "I had brought water" would be inaccurate unless the sentence relates the action to another, later past event (the pluperfect reading above); here no such reference point exists — the suffix signals only that the result has lapsed.

Tense	Ady.	Kbd.	Meaning	Explanation
Discontinuous Past	Псы къэсхьыгъагъ.	Псы къэсхьат.	I brought water (but it is no longer available).	I brought water back then, but it might be over now. There is no English tense for this; "I had brought water" would wrongly imply a reference to another past event.
Simple Past	Псы къэсхьыгъ.	Псы къэсхьащ.	I brought water.	I brought water and it is still available.
Discontinuous Past	Сысымэджэгъагъ.	Сысымаджат.	I was sick.	I was sick before but now I am not.
Simple Past	Сысымэджагъ.	Сысымаджащ.	I got sick.	I became sick and I am still sick.
Discontinuous Past	Америкэм сыщыӀэгъагъ.	Америкэм сыщыӀат.	I was in America.	Like the English "I was in America", this implies that I am no longer in America. The state held in the past and has since been discontinued.

==== 3. Remote Past (back then, at that time) ====
In both Adyghe and Kabardian, the suffix ~гъагъ / ~ат can also situate an event in the remote past, meaning "back then", "at that time in the past" or "a long time ago". In this reading there is no second reference event (unlike the pluperfect) and no claim about the result being reversed (unlike the discontinuous past); the suffix simply pushes the event further back in time, in contrast with the simple past ~гъ / ~ащ, which tends to be understood as recent (today, yesterday, or relatively close to the present). For this meaning Kabardian additionally possesses dedicated distant past forms built with the marker -гъа- (~гъащ and ~гъат), described in the next subsection.

Crucially, the remote past is relative and context-dependent. It does not have to mean "years ago": it can refer to "way back earlier on this same day" just as well as to "once upon a time". What it always conveys is that the event is felt to be distant from the present moment, by the standards of the situation being discussed.

Tense	Ady.	Kbd.	Meaning	Explanation
Remote Past	Тутын сешъогъагъ.	Тутын сефат.	I smoked (back then / a long time ago).	Once upon a time in the past I smoked — stating a fact situated in the distant past. Note that "I had smoked a cigarette" would be a wrong translation: there is no other past event being referred to, so the English pluperfect does not apply.
Simple Past	Тутын сешъуагъ.	Тутын сефащ.	I smoked a cigarette.	I smoked recently (today, yesterday, or relatively close to present).
Remote Past	Америкэм сыкӀогъагъ.	Америкэм сыкӀуат.	I went to America (once upon a time).	Once upon a time, in the past, I went to America (distant past).
Remote Past	—	Сыщалъхуа хэкур сигу къэкӀат.	I remembered the land I was born in (back then).	At that specific time in the past, I remembered the land I was born in.
Remote Past / Discontinuous Past	Непэ тучаным сыкӀогъагъ.	Нобэ тучаным сыкӀуат.	I went to the shop (way) earlier today.	See the discussion below: depending on context, this is either a remote past within the same day, or a discontinuous past.
Simple Past	Непэ тучаным сыкӀуагъ.	Нобэ тучаным сыкӀуащ.	I went to the shop today.	I went to the shop today, recently, without emphasizing or insinuating anything.

The shop example deserves special attention, because it shows both that the remote past does not have to be "years ago", and that the readings of ~гъагъ / ~ат can overlap. Depending on the context, Непэ тучаным сыкӀогъагъ / Нобэ тучаным сыкӀуат can be understood in two ways:

- As a remote past: the speaker implies that the trip to the shop happened way earlier in the day — that it is not recent. Compare Тучанэм скӀуагъ (simple past), which implies that the speaker went to the shop recently. Both sentences describe the same day, but the ~гъагъ / ~ат form pushes the event back to the morning or much earlier, while the simple past keeps it close to the moment of speaking. This demonstrates that the "remoteness" of the remote past is entirely relative: it can mean "years ago" in one conversation and "way back earlier of this same day" in another.
- As a discontinuous past: the speaker implies that they already went to the shop and the matter is closed — they are no longer interested in going again; the opportunity or relevance of going is gone. For this "already" meaning, however, the dedicated perfect forms with ~гъах fit better: Adyghe скӀогъах ("I already went") or even скӀогъэгъах ("I had already gone back then").

==== Kabardian ~гъащ and ~гъат: dedicated remote past forms ====
Alongside the polysemous ~ат, Kabardian has a pair of dedicated remote past tenses built with the remote past marker -гъа-, the same element that appears in the Adyghe suffix ~гъагъ. While the simple past (~ащ) and the pluperfect (~ат) deal with general or recent past events, adding -гъа- pushes the timeline further back into the remote past:

~гъащ (distant past): known in Kabardian grammar as блэкӀа жыжьэ зэфӀэкӀа зэман. It is formed by combining the remote past marker -гъа- with the assertive suffix -щ, and designates an action completed a very long time ago — "back then", "long ago", "once upon a time": кӀуэ-гъа-щ "he went a long time ago"; сыкӀуэгъащ "I went a long time ago"; тхагъащ "he wrote long ago"; жиӀагъащ "he once said".
~гъат (past of the distant past): known as блэкӀа жыжьэ зэфӀэкӀам и пэ ит зэман. It is formed by combining the remote past marker -гъа- with the past element -т, and functions as a pluperfect anchored in the distant past: the action had already been completed long ago before another distant past event occurred: кӀуэ-гъа-т "he had gone a long time ago".

Note the structural parallel between the two pairs ~ащ / ~ат and ~гъащ / ~гъат: in each pair, the form with the assertive -щ is the plain (assertive) past, while the form with -т is its pluperfect counterpart.

Adyghe does not split the remote past into separate assertive and pluperfect forms in this way. Instead, it covers both of these distant past meanings with a single tense — the remote/pluperfect past in ~гъагъ, historically derived from a doubling of the past suffix (-гъэ-гъэ). The Kabardian distant past in ~гъащ thus corresponds directly to the Adyghe forms in ~гъагъ(э):

Meaning	Kbd.	Ady.
He went a long time ago.	кӀуэгъащ	кӀогъагъ
He had gone a long time ago (before another distant past event).	кӀуэгъат	кӀогъагъ
I went a long time ago.	сыкӀуэгъащ	сыкӀогъагъ
I did it a long time ago.	сщӀыгъащ	сшӀыгъагъэ

In summary, where Kabardian uses ~гъащ and ~гъат to distinguish between a remote past and a pluperfect of the remote past, Adyghe universally employs ~гъагъ to capture those same distant timelines.

== Imperfect tense ==
The imperfect tense is formed with the additional suffix ~щтыгъ [ɕtəʁ] in Adyghe and ~(р)т [~(r)t] in Kabardian. In some Adyghe dialects, an analytical construction using -эу щытыгъ is used interchangeably with the suffix (e.g., Тутын сешъощтыгъ can also be expressed as Тутын сешъоу щытыгъ).

This tense serves two primary functions: the Habitual Aspect and the Continuous Aspect.

Imperfect suffix
Language	Suffix	Example
Ady.	~щтыгъ [~ɕtəʁ]	кӀощтыгъ [kʷʼaɕtəʁ] "(s)he was going; used to go"
Kbd.	~(р)т [~(r)t]	кӀуэ(р)т [kʷʼa(r)t] "(s)he was going; used to go"

In Kabardian the variant ~рт appears with vowel-final (dynamic) stems (e.g. кӀуэрт "was going", сефэрт "used to drink"), while plain ~т attaches to other stems.

=== Habitual Aspect ===
This aspect is used to mention an action or state that occurred regularly or habitually in the past, but no longer occurs in the present. In English, it is often translated using the phrase "used to."

Tense	Ady.	Kbd.	Meaning
Habitual Aspect	Тутын сешъощтыгъ ау джы спортым сыпыхьагъ.	Тутын сефэрт ауэ иджы спортым сыпыхьащ.	I used to smoke but now I am into sports.
Habitual Aspect	ЕджапӀэм сыкӀощтыгъ сыныбжьыкӀэу.	ЕджапӀэм сыкӀуэрт сыщӀалэу.	I used to go to school when I was young.
Habitual Aspect	Тучаным сыкӀощтыгъ къещхэу.	Тучаным сыкӀуэрт уэшх къешхыу.	I used to go to the shop while it was raining.
Habitual Aspect	ЕджапӀэм сыкӀощтыгъ тхылъ седжэу гъогумкӀэ.	ЕджапӀэм сыкӀуэрт тхылъ седжэу гъуэгум сытету.	I used to go to school while reading a book on the road.
Habitual Aspect	Зэманым, сэ тутын сешъощтыгъэ.	Зэманым, сэ тутын сефэрт.	In the past, I used to smoke cigarettes.

=== Continuous Aspect ===
This aspect describes an action that was ongoing or continuous in the past, particularly when another action interrupted it or occurred simultaneously. In English, it is typically translated using the past continuous tense ("was / were ...ing").

Tense	Ady.	Kbd.	Meaning
Past Continuous	Тучаным сыкӀощтыгъ къещхэу къызежьэм.	Тучаным сыкӀуэрт уэшх къыщыщӀидзэм.	I was going to the shop when it started raining.
Past Continuous	Джынэс сыкъыоджэщтыгъ, зэхэпхыгъэба?	Иджыри къэс сыноджэрт, зэхэпхакъэ?	I was calling you until now, didn't you hear?

== Conditional perfect ==
The conditional perfect is indicated by adding the suffix ~щтыгъ [~ɕtəʁ] in Adyghe, and ~нт [~nt] or ~нут [~nəwt] in Kabardian. Formally, these endings combine a future suffix with a past element (Adyghe ~щт + ~ыгъ; Kabardian ~н(у) + ~т). Note that in Adyghe the conditional perfect is identical in form to the imperfect; the intended meaning is understood from context, typically from an accompanying conditional clause in -мэ.

Conditional-perfect suffix
Language	Suffix	Example
Ady.	~щтыгъ [~ɕtəʁ] (identical in form to the imperfect)	кӀощтыгъ [kʷʼaɕtəʁ] "(s)he would have gone"
Kbd.	~нт [~nt] / ~нут [~nəwt]	кӀуэнт [kʷʼant] / кӀуэнут [kʷʼanəwt] "(s)he would have gone"

This tense is used to describe an action that would have happened in the past, but ultimately did not—usually because a certain condition or requirement was not met. In English, this concept is most commonly expressed using the structure "would have [done something]" or "could have [done something]."

Sentence Examples & Elaborations:

Ady.	Kbd.	Translation	Explanation
Экзамен зэрэтиӀэ сшӀэгъагъэмэ седжэни нахь дэгъоу зфэзгъэухьазырыщтыгъ.	Экзамен зэрэдиӀэр сщӀагъащэрэтэмэ, седжэнти нэхъ фӀэфӀу зызгъэхьэзырынут.	"If I had known we had an exam, I would have studied and prepared myself for it better."	This sentence demonstrates a sequence of actions that did not happen because the prerequisite condition (knowing about the exam beforehand) was not met. It highlights how multiple hypothetical outcomes ("studying" and "preparing better") can be chained together as a result of a single unfulfilled past condition.
А пшъашъэр къэзгъотышъущтыгъ тичылэдэсгъагъэмэ.	А пщащэр къэзгъуэтыфынут ди къуажэдэсатэмэ.	"I could have found that girl if she was from our village."	Shows a hypothetical outcome (finding the girl) that was impossible because the condition (her living in the speaker's village) was false.
Дышъэм иуасэ зэрэдэкӀоещтыр сшӀэгъагъэмэ, дышъэ бэ сыщэфыщтыгъ.	Дыщэм и уасэр зэрыдэкӀуеинур сщӀагъащэрэтэмэ, дыщэ куэд къэсщэхунут.	"If I had known the price of gold would go up, I would have bought a lot of gold."	Expresses a missed past opportunity due to a lack of necessary foresight or information.
Университетым сщеджэгъагъэмэ, джы Ӏоф нахь дэгъу сӀэщтыгъ.	Университетым сыщеджагъэтэмэ, иджы лэжьапӀэ нэхъыфӀ сиӀэнут.	"If I had studied at the university, I would have a better job now."	Links an unfulfilled past condition directly to a hypothetical present result.

== Future perfect ==
The future perfect tense is indicated by adding the suffix ~гъэщт (or its variants like ~гъагъэщт) in Adyghe; in Kabardian it is formed by combining past-perfect suffixes with future suffixes (e.g., ~гъахэнущ or analogous constructions).

Future-perfect suffix
Language	Suffix	Example
Ady.	~гъэщт [~ʁaɕt] (also ~гъахэщт)	кӀуагъэщт [kʷʼaːʁaɕt] "(s)he will have gone"
Kbd.	~гъахэнущ	кӀуэгъахэнущ "(s)he will have gone"

Note: This tense is relatively uncommon in everyday speech. When it is used, it is frequently combined with the element ~гъах ("already") — in Adyghe yielding ~гъахэщт — to emphasize prior completion.

This tense is used to describe an action that is expected or planned to be completely finished before a specific point of reference in the future. It places the speaker at a future date, looking back at an action that will already be completed by that time. In English, this is expressed using the structure "will have [done something]."

Sentence Examples & Elaborations:

Ady.	Kbd.	Translation	Explanation
Сэ тхылъым седжагъэщт неущы.	Сэ тхылъым седжэгъахэнущ пщэдей.	"I will have read the book by tomorrow."	The speaker is not just saying they will read tomorrow, but rather that the act of reading the book will be entirely completed by the time tomorrow arrives.
Экзамыныр къэсыфэ седжагъэщт.	Экзаменыр къэсыху седжагъэнущ.	"By the time the exam date arrives, I will have studied."	Establishes a concrete future reference point (the arrival of the exam date) by which the primary action (studying) will be completely finished.
Гъусэпшъашъэ угъотыфэ сэ сыкъэщэгъахэщт.	Гъусэпщащэ къэбгъуэтыху сэ сыкъэщэгъахэнущ.	"By the time you find a girlfriend, I will already be married."	Uses the combined "already" suffix (~гъахэщт / ~гъахэнущ) to emphasize that the state of being married will "already" be achieved before the other person's future action occurs.
Неущы хъуфэ лӀыжъыр лӀэгъахэщт.	Пщэдей хъуху лӀыжьыр лӀэгъахэнущ.	"The old man will already be dead by tomorrow."	Stresses that an event is definitively expected to be completed before the specified future time (tomorrow).

== Realization and complication ==
Both Circassian languages can mark the full realization or complication of an action — the sense English carries with "already" or "done" — with a suffix -х. This realization -х should not be confused with the homophonous plural suffix -х(э) that marks a plural argument, or the downward suffix -х: the three are distinct morphemes that happen to share a shape.

In Adyghe the marker attaches either directly to the stem as ~(а)х, signalling that the action is now completed (слъэгъуах "I have finished watching it"), or to the past stem as ~гъах (past -гъа- + realization -х), adding the sense "already" (слъэгъугъах "I have already watched it"; кӀогъах "(s)he has already gone"). Kabardian carries the same "already" value with two suffixes: ~гъэхэ (~хэ), the realization -хэ fused with the past -гъэ (кӀуагъэхэщ "(s)he has already gone"), and ~кӀэ, marking absolute completeness (сщӀакӀэщ "I have already done it").

Realization suffix
Language	Suffix	Example
Ady.	~(а)х (completed), ~гъах [~ʁaːx] (already)	слъэгъуах "I have finished seeing it" / слъэгъугъах "I have already seen it"
Kbd.	~гъэхэ (~хэ) / ~кӀэ	кӀуагъэхэщ / кӀуакӀэщ "(s)he has already gone"

The realized ("already") form is illustrated below across persons and valencies:

English	Ady.	Kbd.
I have already eaten	сэ сышхэгъах	сэ сышхакӀэщ
(s)he has already eaten	ащ ар ышхыгъах	абы ар ишхакӀэщ
I already went	сыкӀогъах	сыкӀуакӀэщ
(s)he has already gone	кӀогъах	кӀуакӀэщ / кӀуагъэхэщ
I have already done it	сшӀыгъах	сщӀакӀэщ

In Adyghe the realization element combines freely with the other tenses, giving the "already" reading in each: past ~гъах (кӀогъах "he has already gone"), pluperfect ~гъэхагъ where it sits between the two past markers (кӀогъэхагъ "he had already gone"), and the future perfect ~гъэхэщт / ~гъахэщт (кӀогъэхэщт "he will already have gone").

=== In subordinate clauses (Adyghe) ===
In Adyghe the realization suffix also appears inside dependent clauses, where the ~ах ("done") versus ~гъах ("already") contrast is preserved. With the negative converb (~мы~…~у) it builds a "before" clause — literally "(subject) not yet having finished V-ing" — and with the conditional -мэ it builds an "after" clause:

Adyghe	English	Construction
филымыр слъэгъуах	I have finished watching the film.	realization ~ах (completion)
филымыр слъэгъугъах	I have already watched the film.	past + realization ~гъах ("already")
нартыф гъэтӀэпагъэ ушӀыфэ, филымыр тлъэгъугъах	By the time you popped the popcorn, we had already finished watching the film.	"by the time" clause in ~фэ + main clause ~гъах (past "already")
нартыф гъэтӀэпагъэ ушӀыфэ, филымыр тлъэгъугъэхэщт	By the time you make the popcorn, we will already have finished watching the film.	"by the time" clause in ~фэ + main clause future perfect ~гъэхэщт ("will already have")
тхылъым сызеджэгъахэм сыгъолъыжьыгъ счъыежьынэу	When I had finished reading the book, I lay down to sleep.	realization in a temporal "when" clause: ~гъахэ-м
тутын семышъогъахэу мэшӀокур къэсыгъ	The train arrived before I had finished smoking.	negative realization converb ~мы~…~гъахэу = "before X finished V-ing"
сэ ащ есымыӀуахэу къэсӀотыщтыгъэр, нэмыкӀхэр ащ къеджэхи ӀукӀыжьын фэягъ занкӀэу	Before I finished telling him what I was saying, others called him and he had to leave immediately	negative realization converb ~мы~…~ахэу
седжахэмэ тхылъым счъыежьыщт	After I finish reading the book, I will go to sleep.	realization ~ах + conditional -мэ ("after having V-ed")
сызышхахэмэ шъуиунэ скъэкӀощт	After I finish eating, I will come to your house.	realization ~ах + conditional -мэ
узышхахэмэ Ӏофыр тыублэщт	After you finish eating, we will start the work	realization ~ах + conditional -мэ
о япэу шхахи удэкӀыщтымэ дэкӀ	First finish eating, and then, if you are going out, go out.	realization ~ах + connective -и ("…and then")

The two popcorn sentences form a minimal pair on the same …ушӀыфэ ("by the time you make…") frame, differing only in the main verb: past realization тлъэгъугъах ("we had already finished") versus future-perfect realization тлъэгъугъэхэщт ("we will already have finished"). The negative "before" rows show the same ~ах / ~гъах split as the matrix clause: ~гъахэу (with the past -гъа-) versus bare ~ахэу.

The conditional likewise allows a three-way contrast: plain седжэмэ "if/when I study" (neutral), realization седжахэмэ "after I finish studying" (the studying is completed before the main clause), and седжэгъахэмэ "after I have already finished studying" (with the past -гъа- added, stressing prior completion — a less common, more marked form). The шхахи example shows the realization ~ах before the connective -и "and (then)", chaining "finish eating" to the following instruction.

A telic verb such as къэтэджын "to stand up" shows the same machinery, with a third, plain-past option:

къэтэджын "to stand up" in three conditional forms ("…let's go over to the aeroplane")
Adyghe	English	Form
АэропортымкӀэ, тыкъэтэджыгъахэмэ, некӀо къухьлъатэм ыдэжь ткӀощт.	At the airport, if we have already stood up (and are now on our feet), let's go over to the aeroplane.	past + realization + conditional ~гъахэ-мэ
АэропортымкӀэ, тыкъэтэджыхэмэ, некӀо къухьлъатэм ыдэжь ткӀощт.	At the airport, after we get up (we are still seated now), let's go over to the aeroplane.	realization + conditional ~хэ-мэ
АэропортымкӀэ, тыкъэтэджыгъэмэ, некӀо къухьлъатэм ыдэжь ткӀощт.	At the airport, if we stand up (and are now on our feet), let's go over to the aeroplane.	plain past + conditional ~гъэ-мэ

Here the past -гъэ- inside ~гъахэ-мэ and ~гъэ-мэ places the standing in the past, so the resulting state holds at speech time ("now on our feet"), the two differing only in the "already" emphasis that -хэ adds. Bare ~хэ-мэ, lacking the past marker, is prospective: the getting-up has not yet occurred ("still seated"), and realization marks it as the precondition that must be completed before the main clause.

=== The cessative ("finality") particle ===
The realization forms above rest on a more general cessative or "finality" particle: Adyghe -х(э), Kabardian -хэ ~ -ххэ (with optional gemination of the consonant). It marks the full realization or completion of an action and, under negation, its total non-realization. Beyond the past "already" reading, the particle takes various surface shapes according to the tense, mood, and affixes it stacks with.

In Adyghe the particle is unified: the same -х(э) serves "first of all", "already", and (negated) "never", and its past form is regularly -гъах(э) — the past -гъэ plus -хэ, with the stress falling on the penultimate syllable and the vowel shifting э→а (-гъэ + -хэ → -гъ-а-х(э)). There is no fundamental difference in meaning between bare -х(э) and -гъах(э), the latter being simply its past ("already") form. The value contributed depends on the host's tense or mood.

Crucially, the particle behaves differently depending on verb type and tense:

- It cannot attach to the present tense of dynamic verbs.
- When attached to the present tense of stative verbs (often denominal), it acts as an intensifier, amplifying the degree of the trait (frequently accompanied by нахь "more").
- It is generally not used in the positive forms of the past imperfect tense or the Future I (-щт) tense.

Adyghe cessative particle -х(э) across contexts
Form	Context / meaning	Examples
-х / -хэ	base, imperative: "first of all", full realization	дэкӀых! "Exit first!"; блэкӀых! "First pass through!"; къэхьыхи кӀо! "First bring it, then go!"; шхахэ, етӀанэ укӀон! "Eat first, then you will go!"; зытхьащкӀыхи шхэ "first wash yourself, then eat"
-гъа-х / -гъа-хэ	past (-гъэ + -хэ): "already completed"	кӀогъах(э) "he already went"; зэригъэшӀэгъах(э) "he already found out" (cf. зэригъэшӀагъ "he found out"); зэӀутхъыгъах "he has already torn it"; зэӀушӀэгъах "he has already mixed it"; ыдыжьыгъах "she has already mended/sewn it"; Тыгъэр къохьажьыгъахэу Армавир нэсыгъ "the sun had already set when she reached Armavir"
-гъэ-ха-гъ / -гъэ-ха-гъэ	pluperfect: the particle sits between two past markers — "had already been completed"	кӀогъэхагъэ "he had already gone"; ашӀэгъэхагъ "they had already known"; Мерэм мыхъугъэмэ, Хъымсадэ иӀоф кӀогъэхагъ? "If not for Merem, Khymsad's business would have already been finished?"
-хэ-щт / -хэ-н	future: action prior to another, or strong capability	есӀохэщт "I will tell him first"; ыӀохэн "he will say it (first)"; Сыдэу щытэу кӀохэна ащ?! "how can he possibly go there?!"; Кругликовым Баскаковыр сыдэущтэу енэкъокъушъухэн? "How will Baskakov be able to compete with Kruglikov?"
-хэ-мэ	conditional: "if only" / "after, as soon as"	зэхихыхэмэ "if only he hears it"; птхыхэмэ къакӀо "after you write it, come over"; зигъэсысыхэмэ… "if only he so much as moves…"; ХьакӀэр шхахэмэ, пчъэм еплъы "after the guest eats, he looks at the door"
-хэ-у	adverbial / gerund: action absolutely realized or completely absent	макъэ пымыӀукӀыхэу "without making a sound at all"
-хэ ужым	postpositional: "after" the full realization of an event	зэкӀохэ ужым "after he had gone"
-хэ-п / -хэ-н-эп / -хэ-щт-эп	negative: absolute intensifier — "never", "absolutely not", "not at all"	зыкъигъэлъэгъожьыгъахэп "he completely didn't show up"; еуцолӀэхэнэп "he will never agree to it"; епӀохэщтэп! "you will never say it!"; Ар сшӀэгъахэп "I absolutely did not know this"; ыгъэшӀэгъогъахэп "he wasn't surprised at all"; пцэжъыемэ псым халъэгъохэщтэп "the fish in the water will absolutely not see her"; уищыкӀэгъахэп "you completely do not need it"
-х(э) (stative present)	present tense (stative verbs only): intense degree, "surpasses"	Ар уянэ нахьи нахь бэлыхьах "She far surpasses your mother"
-х (constant)	constant / absolute realization: "always"	сыхьазырых "I am always/absolutely ready"

Kabardian uses the cognate particle -хэ ~ -ххэ in the same spirit, chiefly for sequence priority ("first"), constant realization ("always"), and absolute negation ("never"):

Kabardian cessative particle -хэ ~ -ххэ
Form	Function	Examples
-ххэ / -хэ	base / imperative: do it "first"	шхэххэ "Eat first!"; жыӀэххэн "to say it first"; къэщэжххэн "to bring (someone/something) back first"; зытхьэщӀыхэн "wash yourself first" (зытхьэщӀыхи шхэ "first wash yourself, then eat")
-ххэ-н / -ххэ-ну	future / infinitive: prior action or capability	щӀыххэн "to do it first"
-ххэ-мэ	conditional: "as soon as" / "if only"	птхыххэмэ "after you write it"
-(х)хэ-щ	assertive / present: constant realization, "always"	щӀэсыххэщ "he is always sitting there"; ещӀэххэщ "he always knows it"; сыхьэзырыхэщ "I am always/absolutely ready"
-ххэ-къым	negative: absolute intensifier — "never", "absolutely not"	жумыӀэххэ! "never say it!"; щӀэсыххэкъым "he is absolutely not sitting there"; мылъагъуххэн "to never see / not see at all"; зигъэлъэгъужаххэкъым "he completely didn't show up"

The two languages differ in how this particle interacts with the past. Adyghe folds it into the past as -гъах to mean "already", as the table above shows. Kabardian, by contrast, expresses the past "already" with the dedicated realization forms -гъэхэ and -кӀэ treated at the start of this section; the geminate cessative -ххэ is not added to the past for this purpose, so there is no *-гъаххэ parallel to Adyghe -гъах.
