= Yoddha =

Yodha or yoddha may refer to:

== Film ==
- Yodha (1991 film), an Indian Hindi-language action drama
- Yoddha (1992 film), an Indian Malayalam-language action comedy
- Yodha (2009 film), an Indian Kannada-language action film
- Yoddha: The Warrior, an Indian Bengali-language fantasy romantic action film
- Yodha (2024 film), an Indian Hindi-language action thriller

== Other uses ==
- Yoddha, a character in Raj Comics
- Tata Yodha, an Indian pickup truck
- The Yoddhas, an Indian cancer organisation
- UP Yoddhas, an Indian kabaddi team

== See also ==
- Yudh (disambiguation)
- Yoda (disambiguation)
- Jodha (disambiguation)
