= Near future (grammar) =

Grammatical tense

Some languages have grammatical categories to represent near future, a subcategory of the future tense.

- Going-to future in English may express near future.
- Similarly to English, the French verb aller (to go) can be used as an auxiliary verb to create a near-future tense (le futur proche). Whereas English uses the continuous aspect (to be going), French uses the simple present tense; for example, the English sentence "I am going to do it tomorrow" would in French be « Je vais le faire demain ». As in English, this form can generally be replaced by the present or future tense: "I am doing it tomorrow", "I shall do it tomorrow", « Je le fais demain », « Je le ferai demain ».
- In Modern Hebrew, an action in the near future is expressed by the participle of הלך (halákh, "to go, to walk") followed by the infinitive.
- Chichewa tenses can be divided into present, recent past, remote past, near future, and remote future. The dividing line between near and remote tenses is not exact, however. Remote tenses cannot be used of events of today, but near tenses can be used of events earlier or later than today.
- Mizo language uses conjugational suffixes dáwn mék for forming near future.

== See also ==
- Crastinal tense
