= Marwari =

Marwari may refer to:

- anything of, from, or related to the Marwar region of Rajasthan, India, largely in the Thar Desert
  - Marwari people, an Indian ethnic group originating in the Marwar region
  - Marwari language, the language of the Marwari people
  - Marwari horse, a horse breed from the Marwar region
  - Marwari sheep
  - Maru or Marwar[i], a character, the princess of Pugal, in the Rajasthani folktale Dhola Maru
- Marwari, Iran, a village in Kurdistan Province, Iran

== See also ==
- Jodhpur (disambiguation), alternative name for the region
- Thar (disambiguation)
- Maru (disambiguation)
