= List of television shows based on Indian history =

This is a list of notable television shows based on subjects of Indian history. Some shows listed below are fictionalised or dramatised shows based on historical events and people.

Show	Original airing	Original channel	Based On
1857 Kranti	29 December 2002 – 21 December 2003	DD National	Indian Rebellion of 1857
21 Sarfarosh	12 February 2018 – 11 May 2018	Investigation Discovery	Battle of Saragarhi
Amrapali (TV series)	30 June 2002	DD National	Amrapali
Beecham House	23 June 2019 – 21 July 2019	ITV (TV network)	Mughal Empire
Bharat Ek Khoj	13 November 1988 – 12 November 1989	DD National	History of India
Bharat Ka Veer Putra – Maharana Pratap	27 May 2013 – 10 December 2015	Sony Entertainment Television	Maharana Pratap
Bharatvarsh (TV series)	20 August 2016 – 23 October 2016	ABP News	History of India
Buddha (TV series)	08 September 2013 – 21 September 2014	DD National	Buddha
Chakravartin Ashoka Samrat	02 February 2015 – 07 October 2016	Colors TV	Ashoka
Chanakya (TV series)	08 September 1991 – 09 August 1992	DD National	Chanakya
Chandra Nandini	10 October 2016 – 10 November 2017	Star Plus	Chandragupta Maurya
Chandragupta Maurya (2011 TV series)	07 March 2011 – 07 April 2012	Imagine TV	Chandragupta Maurya
Chandragupta Maurya (2018 TV series)	14 November 2018 – 30 August 2019	Sony Entertainment Television	Chandragupta Maurya
Chandrashekhar (TV series)	12 March 2018 – 17 July 2018	Star Bharat	Chandra Shekhar Azad
Chittod Ki Rani Padmini Ka Johur	25 May 2009 – 13 August 2009	Sony Entertainment Television	Maharani Padmini
Dastaan-E-Mohabbat Salim Anarkali	01 October 2018 – 04 January 2019	Colors TV	Anarkali
Dharti Ka Veer Yodha Prithviraj Chauhan	12 May 2006 – 15 March 2009	Star Plus	Prithviraj Chauhan
Hazir Jawab Birbal	17 August 2015 – 15 October 2015	Big Magic	Raja Birbal
Ek Veer Stree Ki Kahaani – Jhansi Ki Rani	18 August 2009 – 19 June 2011	Zee TV	Rani Lakshmibai
Khoob Ladi Mardaani – Jhansi Ki Rani	11 February 2019 – 12 July 2019	Colors TV	Rani Lakshmibai
Jodha Akbar	18 June 2013 – 07 August 2015	Zee TV	Jodha Bai
Krantijyoti Savitribai Phule	11 August 2016	DD National	Savitribai Phule
Lord Mountbatten: The Last Viceroy	26 January 1986 - 02 March 1986	ITV (TV network)	Lord Mountbatten
Maharaja Ranjit Singh (TV series)	13 April 2010 – 03 May 2011	DD National	Maharaja Ranjit Singh
Meera	27 July 2009 – 29 January 2010	Imagine TV	Meera Bai
Mirza Ghalib	1988	DD National	Ghalib
Netaji	14 January 2019 – 1 August 2020	Zee Bangla	Subhas Chandra Bose
Noorjahan	2000 – 2001	DD National	Nur Jahan
Param Vir Chakra	1988	DD National	Awardees of Param Vir Chakra
Peshwa Bajirao	30 January 2017 – 21 August 2017	Sony Entertainment Television	Bajirao I
Porus	27 November 2017 – 14 November 2018	Sony Entertainment Television	Porus
Pradhanmantri	13 July 2013 – 4 January 2014	ABP News	Political documentary series about Indian Prime Ministers
Prithvi Vallabh	20 January 2018 – 17 June 2018	Sony Entertainment Television	Vakpati Munja and Mrinalvati
Punyashlok Ahilyabai	4 January 2021 -	Sony Entertainment Television	Ahilyabai Holkar
Razia Sultan	2 March 2015 – 23 October 2015	&TV	Razia Sultana
Samvidhaan	2 March 2014 – 4 May 2014	Rajya Sabha TV	Television series based on the making of the Indian Constitution
Sher-e-Punjab: Maharaja Ranjit Singh	20 March 2017 – 21 July 2017	Life OK	Maharaja Ranjit Singh
Shobha Somnath Ki	20 June 2011 – 26 February 2012	Zee TV	Somnath
Siyaasat	20 November 2014 – 3 September 2015	Epic	Jahangir and Nur Jahan
Tenali Rama	11 July 2017 – 13 November 2020	SAB TV	Tenali Ramakrishna
The Great Maratha	1 February 1994 – 20 December 1994	DD National	Mahadaji Shinde
The Great Moghuls	24 November - 29 December 1992	Channel 4	Mughal Empire
The Sword of Tipu Sultan	25 February 1990 – 17 February 1991	DD National	Tipu Sultan
Veer Shivaji	2 September 2011 – 25 May 2012	Colors TV	Chhatrapati Shivaji
The Empire	27 August 2021 -	Disney+ Hotstar	Mughal Empire
Swarajyajanani Jijamata	19 August 2019 –	Sony Marathi	Jijabai
Raja Shivchhatrapati	24 November 2008 – 2009	Star Pravah	Chhatrapati Shivaji
Swarajyarakshak Sambhaji	24 September 2017 – 29 February 2020	Zee Marathi	Sambhaji
Yug	11 September 1996 – 13 November 1997	DD National	Indian independence movement
Upanishad Ganga	11 March 2012 – 24 March 2013	DD National	Indian Philosophy
Stories by Rabindranath Tagore	6 July 2015	EPIC TV	Culture of India
Ek Mahanayak	17 December 2019 – 05 August 2024	And TV	Bhimrao Ambedkar
Swaraj (TV series)	14 August 2022 – 14 January 2024	DD National	Indian independence movement
Chakravarti Samrat Prithviraj Chauhan	04 June 2025 – 03 October 2025	Sony Entertainment Television	Prithviraj Chauhan
