= Crastinal tense =

Grammatical tense referring to tomorrow

A crastinal tense (abbreviated CRAS) is a future tense applied to a following or subsequent day. (Crāstinō diē is the Latin for 'tomorrow'.)

Crastinal tense refers to an event which will occur tomorrow (in an absolute tense system) or the following day (in a relative tense system). A post-crastinal tense indicates some time after tomorrow or the following day.

Crastinal future (as opposed to a more generic near future) is uncommon, but is found in several Bantu and related languages, such as Luganda and Chichewa.
