= Jodhpur (disambiguation) =

Jodhpur is the second largest city in the Indian state of Rajasthan.

Jodhpur may also refer to:

- Jodhpur National University, premier Indian private university
- Jodhpur district, the district in Rajasthan where the city is located
- Jodhpur Division, the division in Rajasthan where the district and city are located
- Jodhpur (Lok Sabha constituency), a Lok Sabha parliamentary constituency in Rajasthan
- Jodhpur Park, an upscale neighborhood of South Kolkata in Kolkata, West Bengal.
- Jodhpur State was a princely state in the Marwar region from 1250 to 1949
- Jodhpur, Gujarat, a city in the Indian state of Gujarat
- Jodhpur boot, an ankle boot with a buckled strap
- Jodhpurs, a style of trousers used in horse riding

== See also ==
- Jodhpuri, a type of Indian suit
- Marwari (disambiguation), things related to Jodhpur and the Marwar region
- Jodha (disambiguation)
- Pur (disambiguation)
