= Yudh (disambiguation) =

Yudh may refer to:

- Yodh, the tenth letter of many Semitic alphabets
- Yudh (film), a 1985 Indian action thriller film
- Yudh (TV series), an Indian television psychological thriller miniseries starring Amitabh Bachchan
- Yudh: Three perspectives, one truth, a Bharatanatyam Dance Theater production by Savitha Sastry

== See also ==
- Yoddha (disambiguation)
- Yoda (disambiguation)
- Yuddham (1984 film), Indian film
- Yuddham (2014 film), Indian film
