= Object–subject–verb word order =

Language classification

In linguistic typology, the object–subject–verb (OSV) or object–agent–verb (OAV) word order is a structure where the object of a sentence precedes both the subject and the verb. Although this word order is rarely found as the default in most languages, it does occur as the unmarked or neutral order in a few Amazonian languages, including Xavante and Apurinã. In many other languages, OSV can be used in marked sentences to convey emphasis or focus, often as a stylistic device rather than a normative structure. OSV constructions appear in languages as diverse as Chinese, Finnish, and British Sign Language, typically to emphasize or topicalize the object. Examples of OSV structures can also be found in certain contexts within English, Hebrew, and other languages through the use of syntactic inversion for emphasis or rhetorical effect. The OSV order is also culturally recognizable through its use by the character Yoda in Star Wars.

An example of this word order in English would be "Apples Sam ate" (meaning, Sam ate apples).

== Incidence ==
| Order | Example | Usage | Languages |
|---|---|---|---|
| SOV | "Sam apples ate." | 45% | Ainu, Akkadian, Amharic, Ancient Greek, Armenian, Aymara, Bambara, Basque, Bengali, Burmese, Burushaski, Chukchi, Cushitic languages, Dravidian languages, Elamite, Hindustani, Hittite, Hopi, Itelmen, Japanese, Korean, Kurdish, Kurukh, Latin, Lhasa Tibetan, Manchu, Mongolian, Munda languages, Nahuatl, Navajo, Nepali, Nivkh, Northeast Caucasian languages, Northwest Caucasian languages, Pali, Pashto, Persian, Quechua, Sanskrit, Sinhala, Siouan-Catawban languages, Tamil, Tigrinya, Turkic languages, Yukaghir |
| SVO | "Sam ate apples." | 42% | Arabic (modern spoken varieties), Chinese (Mandarin, Cantonese, etc.), English, Estonian, Finnish, Hausa, Hebrew, Indonesian, Kashmiri, Malay, most European languages, Pa'O, Swahili, Thai, Vietnamese, Yucatec Maya |
| VSO | "Ate Sam apples." | 9% | Arabic (classical and modern standard), Berber languages, Biblical Hebrew, Celtic languages, Filipino, Geʽez, Kariri, Mayan languages, Polynesian languages |
| VOS | "Ate apples Sam." | 3% | Algonquian languages, Arawakan languages, Car, Chumash, Fijian, K'iche, Malagasy, Otomanguean languages, Qʼeqchiʼ, Salishan languages, Terêna |
| OVS | "Apples ate Sam." | 1% | Äiwoo, Hixkaryana, Urarina |
| OSV | "Apples Sam ate." | 0% | Haida, Tobati, Warao |
Frequency distribution of word order in languages surveyed by Russell S. Tomlin in the 1980s

== Unmarked word order ==
=== Natural languages ===
OSV is rarely used in unmarked sentences, which use a normal word order without emphasis. Most languages that use OSV as their default word order come from the Amazon basin, such as Xavante, Jamamadi, Apurinã, Warao, Kayabí and Nadëb. The Mizo language of the Mizo people of India also uses OSV in unmarked sentences. Here is an example from Apurinã:

anana nota apa
pineapple I fetch
I fetch a pineapple

British Sign Language (BSL) normally uses topic–comment structure, but its default word order when topic–comment structure is not used is OSV.

== Marked word order ==
Various languages allow OSV word order but only in marked sentences, which emphasise part or all of the sentence.

=== Chinese ===
Passive constructions in Chinese languages follow an OSV (OAV) pattern through the use of various particles, such as 被 (bèi) in Mandarin, 畀 (bei2) in Cantonese, and 予 (hō͘) in Hokkien.

- Mandarin:

这 个 苹果 被 他 吃 掉 了
Zhè ge píngguǒ bèi tā chī diào le
this CL apple by he eat {} PFV
This apple was eaten by him.

- Cantonese:

呢 個 蘋果 畀 佢 食 咗 喇
Ni1 go3 ping4gwo2 bei2 keoi5 sik6 zo2 laa3
this CL apple by he eat PFV SFP
This apple was eaten by him.

- Hokkien:

這 粒 蘋果 予 伊 食 去 矣
chit lia̍p phông-kó hō͘ i chia̍h khì ah
this CL apple by he eat PFV SFP
This apple was eaten by him.

=== English ===
In English, object-subject-verb order is atypical but can be used for contrastive focus, as in: That car we bought at least five years ago. The other one we only bought last year.

=== Finnish ===
Finnish has a remarkably flexible word order and so emphasis on the object is often marked simply by putting it first in the sentence. The word by word translation in example (1) would be "you I love!" and expresses a contrast to maybe loving someone else.

Sinua minä rakastan!
2SG.PTV 1SG.NOM 1SG.love.PRS.IND
"I love you!"

This word order is totally natural and quite often used for emphasis. Example (2) expresses the contrast of refusing to eat something else (like something more healthy).

Suklaata se kyllä suostuu syömään
chocolate.PTV 3.SG INT 3SG.consent.PRS.IND eat.ILL
"Chocolate he does agree to eat."

=== Hebrew ===
In Modern Hebrew, OSV is often used instead of the normal SVO to emphasise the object. "אני אוהב אותה" would mean "I love her", but "אותה אני אוהב" would mean "It is she whom I love". Possibly an influence of Germanic (via Yiddish), as Jewish English uses a similar construction ("You, I like, kid") much more than many other varieties of English and often with the "it is" left implicit.

=== Hungarian ===
In Hungarian, OSV emphasises the subject:

A szócikket én szerkesztettem = The article I edited (It was I, not somebody else, who edited the article).

=== Korean and Japanese ===
Korean and Japanese have SOV by default, but since they are topic-prominent languages, they often seem to be OSV when the object is topicalized. Here is an example in Korean:

그 사과–는 제–가 먹–었–어–요
geu sagwa-neun je-ga meog-eoss-eo-yo
that apple-TOP I.POL-NOM eat-PST-DEC-POL
{} Object Subject Verb
As for the apple, I ate it. (or) The apple, I ate.

An almost identical syntax is possible in Japanese:

その りんご゠は 私゠が 食べ゠まし゠た
sono ringo-wa watashi-ga tabe-mashi-ta
that apple-TOP I.POL-NOM eat-POL-PST/PERF
{} Object Subject Verb
As for the apple, I ate it. (or) The apple, I ate.

=== Malayalam ===
OSV is one of the permissible word orders in Malayalam, the other being SOV. Here is an example of this occurring in Malayalam:

ഈ കുമളിപ്പഴം ഞാൻ തിന്നു.
ī kumaḷipaẓam ṅāṉ ṭinnu
this apple me ate
I ate this apple.

=== Portuguese ===
OSV is possible in Portuguese to emphasize the object.

De maçã eu não gosto
of apple I NEG like-1SG
{} Object Subject {} Verb
I do not like apple

=== Turkish ===
OSV is used in Turkish to emphasize the subject:

yemeğ-i ben pişir-di-m
meal-ACC I cook-PST-1SG
It was I, not somebody else, who cooked the meal.

== See also ==
- Yoda conditions - a style of writing conditionals in computer programming languages

| Order | Example | Usage | Languages |
|---|---|---|---|
| SOV | "Sam apples ate." | 45% | Ainu, Akkadian, Amharic, Ancient Greek, Armenian, Aymara, Bambara, Basque, Bengali, Burmese, Burushaski, Chukchi, Cushitic languages, Dravidian languages, Elamite, Hindustani, Hittite, Hopi, Itelmen, Japanese, Korean, Kurdish, Kurukh, Latin, Lhasa Tibetan, Manchu, Mongolian, Munda languages, Nahuatl, Navajo, Nepali, Nivkh, Northeast Caucasian languages, Northwest Caucasian languages, Pali, Pashto, Persian, Quechua, Sanskrit, Sinhala, Siouan-Catawban languages, Tamil, Tigrinya, Turkic languages, Yukaghir |
| SVO | "Sam ate apples." | 42% | Arabic (modern spoken varieties), Chinese (Mandarin, Cantonese, etc.), English, Estonian, Finnish, Hausa, Hebrew, Indonesian, Kashmiri, Malay, most European languages, Pa'O, Swahili, Thai, Vietnamese, Yucatec Maya |
| VSO | "Ate Sam apples." | 9% | Arabic (classical and modern standard), Berber languages, Biblical Hebrew, Celtic languages, Filipino, Geʽez, Kariri, Mayan languages, Polynesian languages |
| VOS | "Ate apples Sam." | 3% | Algonquian languages, Arawakan languages, Car, Chumash, Fijian, K'iche, Malagasy, Otomanguean languages, Qʼeqchiʼ, Salishan languages, Terêna |
| OVS | "Apples ate Sam." | 1% | Äiwoo, Hixkaryana, Urarina |
| OSV | "Apples Sam ate." | 0% | Haida, Tobati, Warao |
Frequency distribution of word order in languages surveyed by Russell S. Tomlin in the 1980s
