= Mizo grammar =

Linguistic traits and structure of the Mizo Language

Mizo grammar is the grammar of the Mizo language, a Tibeto-Burman language spoken by about a million people in Mizoram, Manipur, Tripura, Burma and Chittagong Hill Tracts of Bangladesh. It is a highly inflected language, with fairly complex noun phrase structure and word modifications. Nouns and pronouns are declined, and phrasal nouns also undergo an analogous declension.

== Word order ==
Mizo's default declarative word order is subject–object–verb. Chhangte demonstrates this with the following example:

Naupang-in sazu a man.
child-ERG rat 3SG catch
"The child caught a rat."

More elaborately, the general sentence order is subject–instrumental–locative–indirect object–direct object–verb.

However, an object that is the focus of the sentence can appear before the subject in the front of the sentence to create an apparent object–subject–verb order.

Also, Mizo uses Object-Subject-Verb in unmarked sentences In this work it says

"The Mizo language also diverges from English not only in structure and word order but in its declarative sentence construction which follows an Object-Subject-Verb (OSV) order. In its basic or unmarked word order, Mizo tends to build sentences in a way where the main elements such as the subject or object come first on the left side and additional information is added to the right. Instead of using prepositions (like "under" or "over"), Mizo uses postpositions which are similar but come after the noun they modify. For example, instead of saying "on the table", in Mizo, we say "table chungah" which literally translates to "the table on"."

If the unmarked sentences are converted to Subject-Object-Verb, the ergative -in or -an must be used. However, this will also change the sentence into a marked sentence. An example is given below

- Chaw ka ei.

Food I eat.

"I am eating food."

Converting to Subject-Verb-Object, we get

- Keimah-in chaw ka ei.

I/Myself-ERG food I eat.

"I, myself am eating food"

The sentence changes from unmarked to marked when the ergative -in is added, making Mizo one of the few languages in the world to use OSV in its unmarked, declarative sentences.

== Nouns ==
There is no grammatical gender in Mizo language, although some animals, birds etc. have names which contain one of the suffixes -nu, which means female, or -pa which means male. Examples include chingpirinu (a type of big owl), kawrnu (a type of cicada), thangfènpa (a nocturnal bird).

=== Non-derived nouns ===
Mizo is an agglutinative language in which it is rare to find morphologically simple, non-derived nouns. However, common everyday objects and domestic animals tend to fall in this category, that is, the category of morphologically simple, non-derived nouns. For example,

- vạwk, 'pig'
- ịp, 'bag/sack'
- tláng, 'mountain'
- sǎm, 'hair'
- ár, 'chicken'
- lụi, 'river'

=== Derived nouns ===
The most common form of noun is that of derived, morphologically complex, poly-syllabic nouns. Most abstract nouns belong to this category, and so do wild animals and other less common objects. Examples include

sa + mak = samak
animal {} strange {} rhinoceros

fa + nu = fanu
offspring {} female {} daughter

sual + na = sualna
wicked {} -ness {} wickedness

mâwl + na = mâwlna
stupid {} -ness {} stupidity

=== Pluralisation ===
Nouns are pluralised by the addition of one of the suffixes -te, -ho, -teho and -hote. However, a non-pluralised noun can have the sense of a pluralised noun, and common nouns are usually not pluralised, as in:

Sava tam deuh ka hmu
bird/s many very I see
I see a lot of birds

Here sava is not pluralised to savate or savaho; rather, sava functions as a plural.

=== Declension of nouns ===
Nouns are declined into cases as follows (here we show the tones in accordance with the usage in Mizo Wiktionary, which is an extension of the common usage in Mizo newspapers such as Vanglaini and monthlies such as Lengzem chanchinbu):

Nominative	Genitive	Accusative	Ergative	Instrumental
nụlá the/a girl	nụla the/a girl's	nụlá the/a girl	nụláịn (by) the/a girl	nụláin using/with a girl
tǔi water	tǔi	tǔi	tuiịn	tuiin
Thangạ (a proper noun)	Thanga	Thangạ	Thangȧ'n	Thangạ-in/Thangạ hmangin

=== Nominalisation ===
Verbs and adjectives are nominalised by suffixing -na, and adjectives can also be nominalised by suffixing -zia. For example:

Verb	Adjective	Nominalisation by -na	Nominalisation by -zia'
kal		kạlna	
	süal	sùalna	
	süal		sùalzìa
vùa		vûakna	

When -na is suffixed to a transitive verb then the resulting noun means either the instrument with which the action described by the verb is achieved, or the object/sufferer of the action or the point of action of the verb. For example, vùa means to beat/strike with a stick, and vûakna means a whip, an object with which one can beat, or a point or place where the beating takes place, a point where something is beaten.

When -na is suffixed to an intransitive verb, then the resulting noun means a place etc. through which the action can take place. For example, kal means to go, kalna means where something/someone goes or can go, way, path. For example:

A kalna kan hre lo	→	We do not know where he went/where he has gone.
Hei chu a kalna dik a ni lo tawp mai!	→	This is definitely not the right way.

When -zia is suffixed to an adjective, the resulting noun means the condition of having the quality described by the adjective. For example, süal means evil, sùalzìa' means sinfulness, evilness.

=== Agentiviser ===
The suffix -tu in Mizo ṭawng is equivalent to the suffix -er or -or in English, as in:

{püan " ṭhui} → {püan ṭhuitu}
{to sew a cloth} {} tailor

véng → véngtû
{to protect} {} protector

== Pronouns ==
=== Forms ===
All Mizo pronouns occur in two forms, namely in free form and clitic form and are declined into cases.

Mizo pronouns
	nominative	genitive	accusative	ergative
clitic forms	ka, 'I'	ka, 'my, mine'	mi, min, 'me'	keima'n, 'by me'
clitic forms	kan, 'we'	kan, 'our, ours'	min, 'us'	keimahnin, 'by us'
clitic forms	i, 'you (singular)'	i, 'your, yours'	che, 'you'	nangma'n, 'by you'
clitic forms	in, 'you (plural)'	in, 'your, yours'	che u, 'you'	nangmahnin, 'by you'
clitic forms	a, 'he, she, it'	a, 'his, hers, its'	amah, 'him, her, it'	ama'n, 'by him, by her, by it'
clitic forms	an, 'they'	an, 'their, theirs'	anmahni, 'them'	anmahni'n, 'by them'
free forms	kei, 'I'	keima, 'my, mine'	keimah, 'me'	keima'n, 'by me'
free forms	keimah, 'we'	keima, 'our, ours'	keimah, keimah min, 'us'	keima'n, 'by us'
free forms	keini, 'you (singular)'	keini, 'your, yours'	keini min, 'you'	keini'n, 'by you'
free forms	keimahni, 'you (plural)'	keimahni, 'your, yours'	keimahni min, 'you'	keimahni'n, 'by you'
free forms	anni, 'he, she, it'	anni, 'his, hers, its'	anni, 'him, her, it'	anni'n, 'by him, by her, by it'
free forms	anmahni, 'they'	anmahni, 'their, theirs'	anmahni, 'them'	anmahni'n, 'by them'

The free form is mostly used for emphasis, and has to be used in conjunction with either the clitic form or an appropriate pronominal particle, as shown in the following examples:

1. Kei (=I free form) ka (=I clitic form)lo tel ve kher a ngai em?. This is a somewhat emphatic way of saying Ka lo tel ve kher a ngai em?
2. Nangni (=you pl., free form) in (you pl., clitic form) zo tawh em? This is a somewhat emphatic way of saying Nangni in zo tawh em?
3. Ani (he/she) a (s/he) kal ve chuan a ṭha lo vang.

The clitic form is also used as a genitive form of the pronoun.

== Adjectives ==
=== Attributive ===
Mizo adjectives (Mizo: hrilhfiahna), when used attributively, follow the nouns they describe, as follows:

naupang fel
child good
a good child

lehkhabu chhiartlâk
book readable
a readable book

hmasawnna chhenfâkawm
development sustainable
sustainable development

artui {pum ruk}
egg six
six eggs

=== Predicative ===
When used predicatively, Mizo adjectives are syntactically verbs, being usually preceded by the subject pronoun clitics, as in:

A fel
S/he or it is good

A ṭha
it is good

In these two sentences, a is the subject pronoun clitic, and the adjectives fel and ṭha function as verbs (syntactically).

=== Adjective sequences ===
When adjectives follow each other, the preferred order is the following:

1. color
2. quality or opinion
3. size
4. shape

as in

Puan sen (color) mawi (quality) hlai (size) bial (shape) deuh.

=== Quantifiers ===
The most common quantifiers in Mizo ṭawng are zawng zawng (all/each and every), ṭhenkhat (some [of a whole]), väi (all/every), zà (all/every). Some examples are given below:

varak {zawng zawng}
duck all
All the ducks

kan zà
we all
All of us

== Verbs ==
=== Occurrence ===
Verbs (Mizo: thiltih) and verb phrases occur last in a sentence. Since adjectives can function as verbs, it is common in sentences to have no true verb, as in:

A fel vek mai ang
A dik vêl vek!

In these two sentences, the adjectives fel and dik function syntactically as verbs, and there are no other verbs in either of them.

=== Tense ===
Mizo verbs are not conjugated by changing the desinence. The tense is clarified by the aspect and the addition of conjugating particles, such as

- ang (for forming simple future),
- tawh (for forming simple past and past perfect),
- mék (for forming progressive tenses, present and past),
- dáwn (for forming simple future),
- dáwn mék (for forming near future),

etc.

== Adverbs ==
=== Occurrence ===
Adverbs usually follow the verbs or adjectives they describe.

== See also ==
- Meitei grammar

== Notes and references ==
Others:
1. Dokhuma, James, Mizo ṭawng kalphung
2. Zoppen club, Mizo ṭawng thumal thar, 2011.
3. SCERT, Mizo grammar and composition, cl XI & XII textbooks.
