= Morvarid, Kurdistan =

Morvarid مرواريد
- Village
- Location within Iran
- Coordinates: 34°52′45″N 46°58′06″E
- Country: Iran
- Province: Kurdistan
- County: Kamyaran
- Bakhsh: Central
- Rural District: Bilavar

Population (2006)
  - Total: 283
- Time zone: UTC+3:30 (IRST)
  - Summer (DST): UTC+4:30 (IRDT)

Morvarid (Persian: مرواريد, also Romanized as Morvārīd; also known as Marwāri) is a village in Bilavar Rural District, in the Central District of Kamyaran County, Kurdistan Province, Iran. At the 2006 census, its population was 283, in 55 families. The village is populated by Kurds.
