= Yoda =

Fictional character in the Star Wars universe

- Star Wars character
- Yoda in The Empire Strikes Back (1980)
- First appearance: The Empire Strikes Back
- Created by: George Lucas
- Voiced by: Frank Oz (Note: prequel trilogy, original trilogy, sequel trilogy, and Star Wars Rebels); Tom Kane (Note: The Clone Wars (series), The Clone Wars (film), Forces of Destiny, Clone Wars, Lego Star Wars productions, and various video games); John Lithgow (Note: Radio dramas); Peter McConnell (Note: Super Star Wars: The Empire Strikes Back); Piotr Michael (Note: Young Jedi Adventures); Tony Pope (Note: Star Wars: Rebellion)
- Performed by: Frank Oz
- Known for: Reverse speech pattern

In-universe information
- Full name: Yoda
- Species: Unknown
- Gender: Male
- Occupation: Jedi Master; Jedi Grand Master; Jedi General
- Affiliation: Jedi Order
- Apprentices: Count Dooku; Obi-Wan Kenobi; Luke Skywalker

Yoda is a fictional character in the Star Wars franchise. He is a small, green, elderly humanoid alien who is powerful with the Force, and he typically speaks in an inverted phrase order. He first appeared in the 1980 film The Empire Strikes Back, in which he is voiced and puppeteered by Frank Oz, who reprised the role in the sequel film Return of the Jedi (1983), and in the Star Wars prequel trilogy, the sequel trilogy, and the animated series Star Wars Rebels. Other actors who have voiced Yoda are Tom Kane, John Lithgow, Peter McConnell, Piotr Michael and Tony Pope. In addition to films and television series, Yoda has appeared in comics, novels, video games and commercials.

In the original trilogy, Yoda lives in solitude on the swamp planet Dagobah. He is introduced as a former mentor of the Jedi Master Obi-Wan Kenobi, and he trains Luke Skywalker in the ways of the Force until his death at the age of 900. In the prequel films, Yoda leads the Jedi High Council and trains young Jedi until they are assigned to a master. When the Clone Wars break out, he becomes a general in the army of the Republic and leads several legions of clone troopers. Yoda is one of the few Jedi to survive the events of Order 66 at the end of the war, when he battles Darth Sidious and is forced to go into hiding. Yoda's Force spirit appears again in the sequel trilogy, advising an older Luke on his training of Rey.

== Creation ==
The Star Wars franchise was created by George Lucas, who wrote and directed the original Star Wars film (1977). (Note: Originally titled Star Wars, the film was later retitled Star Wars: Episode IV—A New Hope.) He created the character Obi-Wan Kenobi as a mentor for Luke Skywalker, and originally planned for Obi-Wan to continue training Luke in the sequel, The Empire Strikes Back. However, Lucas ultimately decided that Obi-Wan would die in the first film. Lucas then introduced a new mentor character, who was originally a diminutive frog-like creature called "Minch Yoda". The name "Yoda" was chosen because Lucas envisioned the character as a "little Dalai Lama", and he wanted him to have an "Eastern-sounding" name. One of the film's screenwriters, Lawrence Kasdan, said that Yoda was based on Shimada, the lead samurai from the 1954 Akira Kurosawa film Seven Samurai. According to Lucas, the narrative goal of Yoda's design was to teach Luke "to respect everybody and pay attention to the poorest person". Lucas wanted Yoda to be the "exact opposite" of what audiences would expect.

The film's visual effects art director, Joe Johnston, sketched hundreds of different versions of Yoda. The design that Lucas finally settled on was described by Johnston as a combination of a leprechaun, a troll and a gnome. Lucas gave Yoda a backward speech pattern because he felt the character needed a unique way of speaking that was more dramatic than an accent.

== Portrayal ==
The production team working on The Empire Strikes Back considered several ways of portraying Yoda, such as using stop-motion animation or dressing a monkey, a child or a dwarf in a Yoda costume. (Note: For wide shots of Yoda moving around, the dwarf actor Deep Roy wore a Yoda suit.) They ultimately decided to use a sophisticated puppet, which was created by Stuart Freeborn and Wendy Froud. Freeborn based Yoda's face on his own facial features and those of Albert Einstein, hoping that Einstein's features would make the character appear intelligent. Lucas asked Jim Henson, the creator of the Muppets, to perform the puppeteering for Yoda. Henson was busy with another project, however, and recommended Frank Oz for the role. To perform Yoda in The Empire Strikes Back, Oz inserted his hand into the puppet's head to manipulate the mouth and brow. Kathryn Mullen, Wendy Froud and David Barclay operated Yoda's eyes, ears and other body parts using cables, strings, hydraulics and electronic mechanisms. There was also a radio-controlled Yoda puppet that was used when the Jedi Master is riding on Luke's back. Lucas originally intended for an actor other than Oz to provide Yoda's voice, but ultimately decided that Oz was the best performer for the role.

In the original 1999 release of The Phantom Menace, Yoda was portrayed by a new puppet in all but two shots. In these two wide shots, the character was created using computer-generated imagery (CGI). The puppet was replaced with a digital Yoda in the 2011 Blu-ray release of the film and in the 2012 theatrical 3D release. In Attack of the Clones (2002) and Revenge of the Sith (2005), Yoda is entirely computer-generated. The digital character accomplishes movements not possible with the puppet, such as fighting with a lightsaber. In Revenge of the Sith, Yoda's face is shown in several close-ups, which required highly detailed CGI work.

== Reception ==
Yoda was well-received by several prominent critics when he debuted in The Empire Strikes Back in 1980. Vincent Canby of The New York Times called him "delightful" and "the hit of the movie", but felt he was only a success when used sparingly. Joy Gould Boyum of The Wall Street Journal praised the "exquisitely constructed" Yoda puppet, and said that Oz "so finely put together [the character] ... as to make us wonder continually if he isn't real." Arthur Knight of The Hollywood Reporter and Gary Arnold of The Washington Post similarly felt that Yoda was incredibly lifelike, with Arnold comparing his face to that of a human actor. Gene Siskel of the Chicago Tribune called Yoda the highlight of the film, while People magazine called him a pivotal character. In his review of the 1997 re-release of The Empire Strikes Back, Roger Ebert praised the range of emotions conveyed by Yoda, and said his acting was possibly the best in the film.

Yoda has been a popular character since his introduction more than forty years ago. Brandon Katz of Observer has called him an icon of cinema. Empire magazine claimed that after the droids C-3PO and R2-D2, Yoda is the "most beloved" character in the Star Wars franchise.

== Appearances ==
=== Original trilogy ===
Yoda was introduced in The Empire Strikes Back (1980), in which he is puppeteered and voiced by Frank Oz. In the film, Luke arrives on Dagobah to seek his guidance at the behest of Obi-Wan's Force spirit. At first, Yoda does not identify himself to Luke and instead tests his patience by provoking him. Luke is shocked when he discovers that this small, eccentric creature is the powerful Jedi Master he was seeking. Finding Luke to be impatient and undisciplined, Yoda is reluctant to mentor him in the ways of the Force, but agrees to the task after conferring with Obi-Wan. Before finishing his training, Luke chooses to leave Dagobah to confront Darth Vader and help his friends in Cloud City. Yoda and Obi-Wan warn that he is not ready, but Luke leaves anyway. When Obi-Wan laments that Luke is their "last hope", Yoda reminds him that "there is another".

Yoda appears briefly in Return of the Jedi (1983), again performed and voiced by Oz. Now sick and frail, he tells Luke that his training is complete, but that he will not be a Jedi until he confronts Darth Vader. Yoda also confirms that Vader is Luke's father, something Vader had told Luke in the previous film. Yoda then peacefully dies at the age of 900, his body disappearing as he becomes "one with the Force". He leaves Luke with the knowledge that "there is another Skywalker." Soon after, Obi-Wan's spirit helps Luke realize that the "other" is his twin sister, Princess Leia. In the film's final scene, Yoda's spirit appears on Endor alongside the spirits of Obi-Wan and Anakin Skywalker.

=== Prequel trilogy ===
A younger Yoda appears in the prequel trilogy, beginning with The Phantom Menace (1999). In the film—which is set 35 years before The Empire Strikes Back—Jedi Master Qui-Gon Jinn brings the young Anakin Skywalker to the Jedi Council. Convinced that Anakin is the "Chosen One" of Jedi prophecy who will bring balance to the Force, Qui-Gon requests that the boy be trained as a Jedi. Yoda senses great fear in Anakin, especially in regards to his attachment to his mother Shmi, and foresees "grave danger" in his training. The Council, led by Mace Windu, rejects Qui-Gon's request. When Qui-Gon is mortally wounded in a duel with the Sith Lord Darth Maul, his dying request is that his apprentice Obi-Wan Kenobi train Anakin. Obi-Wan tells Yoda that he will train the boy, even without the Council's approval. Yoda reluctantly gives his blessing to Anakin's training.

Yoda was created digitally for Attack of the Clones, which allowed him complete freedom of movement for the first time.

Attack of the Clones (2002) is set a decade after The Phantom Menace. Yoda is now the Master of the High Council in addition to his position as Grandmaster. He and many other Jedi are concerned about the emergence of the Confederacy of Independent Systems, a secessionist movement seeking independence from the Galactic Republic. After the first attempted assassination of Senator Padmé Amidala, Chancellor Palpatine suggests that she be put under the protection of Obi-Wan, who is training Anakin. At the climax of the film, Yoda saves Obi-Wan and Anakin from the Separatists and defeats his former apprentice, Count Dooku, in a lightsaber duel.

In Revenge of the Sith (2005), Yoda and the Jedi Council pursue the mysterious Sith Lord Darth Sidious. Palpatine has now amassed near-dictatorial emergency powers, and begins interfering in Jedi affairs. The Council orders Anakin to spy on Palpatine, whom he considers a friend and mentor. Anakin seeks Yoda's counsel about his prophetic visions that someone close to him will die. Yoda, unaware that Anakin is referring to Padmé, tells him to train himself to let go of everything he fears to lose. Unsatisfied, Anakin turns to Palpatine, who then reveals himself as Darth Sidious. The Sith Lord manipulates the young Jedi into becoming his apprentice, suggesting that the dark side of the Force can save Padmé from dying.

Sidious transforms the Republic into the Galactic Empire, proclaiming himself emperor and ordering the clone troopers to kill their Jedi generals. Through the Force, Yoda feels the deaths of each of the Jedi as they are betrayed by their own troops. After killing the clone troopers instructed to assassinate him, he escapes with the Wookiee leaders Tarfful and Chewbacca to Coruscant, where he and Obi-Wan fight their way into the Jedi Temple. They discover that all the Jedi inside have been slaughtered, including the children. Yoda and Obi-Wan find a recording revealing that Anakin—now known as Darth Vader—was the assassin. Yoda decides to face Sidious, and sends Obi-Wan to kill Vader. When Obi-Wan protests, Yoda tells him that the Anakin he knew no longer exists. Yoda battles Sidious in a lightsaber duel in the Senate. In the end, neither is able to overcome the other and Yoda is forced to retreat. After Padmé dies in childbirth, Yoda recommends that her infant twins Luke and Leia be hidden from Vader and Sidious; he sends Leia to Alderaan and Luke to Tatooine. At the end of the film, it is revealed that Yoda has been learning the secret of immortality from Qui-Gon's spirit and passing it on to Obi-Wan.

=== Sequel trilogy ===
Oz reprises the Yoda role in the sequel trilogy, both as a puppeteer and as a voice actor. (Note: Attributed to multiple references:) The first film of the trilogy, The Force Awakens (2015), takes place thirty years after Yoda's death in Return of the Jedi. When the scavenger Rey has a Force vision and discovers Luke's lightsaber, she hears Yoda's voice. In The Last Jedi (2017), Yoda appears to Luke as a Force spirit. As Luke considers whether to burn down a tree storing sacred Jedi texts, Yoda reminds him that a Jedi must always be sure of his path. When Luke decides to burn down the tree, Yoda summons a lightning bolt and sets it ablaze. Luke is suddenly concerned about the loss of the texts, but Yoda assures him that they contained no knowledge that Rey does not already possess. Yoda's voice is heard again in The Rise of Skywalker (2019) when many deceased Jedi are speaking to Rey during her battle against the resurrected Darth Sidious.

=== The Clone Wars ===
Yoda appears in the 2008 animated film The Clone Wars and the television series of the same name. He is voiced by Tom Kane in both productions. In the film, he assigns Anakin an apprentice, Ahsoka Tano, believing the responsibility will help him grow as a Jedi and mature as a person. Throughout most of the series, Yoda is on Coruscant with the Jedi Council, but he occasionally leaves for certain tasks, such as negotiations with King Katuunko on Rugosa and a confrontation with Asajj Ventress's droid army. Yoda also watches over Anakin and Ahsoka, pleased that they are both maturing with each other's influence. In season five, Ahsoka is framed for a crime she did not commit, and Yoda and the Jedi Council turn her over to the Republic military. Before a verdict is read in Ahsoka's trial, Anakin reveals the true culprit, the fallen Jedi Barriss Offee. Yoda, Anakin, and the Council then invite Ahsoka to rejoin the Order, but she refuses.

In the sixth season, Yoda hears the voice of the deceased Qui-Gon Jinn. He travels to Dagobah to find answers. He sees cryptic visions of the fall of the Jedi, and learns that he has been chosen to manifest his consciousness after death as a Force spirit. A group of spirit priestesses then gives him various tests, including facing an illusion of the ancient Sith Lord Darth Bane. His final challenge is to resist an attempt by Sidious and Dooku to lure him to the dark side. Yoda engages in a metaphysical battle with Sidious and seemingly sacrifices himself to save Anakin, only to awaken and discover that the battle was merely a vision, and that he passed the test. The priestesses inform Yoda that his training will resume in time.

=== Star Wars Rebels ===
Yoda returns in the animated series Star Wars Rebels (2014–2018). In the season one episode "Path of the Jedi", he telepathically communicates with the Jedi apprentice Ezra Bridger and his master Kanan Jarrus, helping the pair to understand their true motivations. In the season two episode "Shroud of Darkness", Yoda appears to Ezra in a vision.

=== Tales of the Jedi ===
Yoda appears in two episodes of Tales of the Jedi (2022), although he has no dialogue. In the third episode, he attends the funeral of Jedi Master Katri, and in the fifth episode he observes the training of Ahsoka.

=== Other ===
Yoda is voiced by John Lithgow in the radio dramatizations of The Empire Strikes Back (1983) and Return of the Jedi (1996). He is featured in the audio drama Dooku: Jedi Lost and the novel Master and Apprentice, both released in 2019. He appears in the web series Forces of Destiny (2017–2018), the children's television series Young Jedi Adventures (2023–present) and the 2021 comic The High Republic Adventures, which takes place 200 years before the prequel trilogy. He also makes a non-speaking cameo appearance in the final episode of the television series The Acolyte (2024). In 2012, Yoda was featured in a series of Vodafone commercials, which were broadcast in the United Kingdom.

== Star Wars Legends ==
Following the acquisition of Lucasfilm by The Walt Disney Company in 2012, most of the licensed Star Wars novels and comics produced between 1977 and 2014 were rebranded as Star Wars Legends and declared non-canon to the franchise. The Legends works comprise a separate narrative universe. (Note: Attributed to multiple references:)

=== Novels and comics ===
Yoda appears in the 2004 Sean Stewart novel Yoda: Dark Rendezvous, in which he sends an impersonator of himself to negotiate a treaty with Dooku. He is also a character in the comic series Star Wars: Republic.

=== Clone Wars ===
Yoda is voiced by Tom Kane in the animated television series Clone Wars, which aired on Cartoon Network from 2003 to 2005. In the series, Yoda becomes a general during the Clone Wars. While escorting Padmé on a journey, he senses a Force disturbance on the planet Ilum. After using a Jedi mind trick to convince Captain Typho to take them there, Yoda saves the lives of two Jedi. In the final episode of the series, Yoda fights alongside Mace Windu to defend Coruscant, which is under attack from the Separatists. The two Jedi Masters realize too late that the battle was intended to distract them from the kidnapping of Palpatine by the Separatist leader General Grievous. Clone Wars was removed from the official canon in 2014 and placed in the Legends universe.

== See also ==
- "Yoda"—a parody song by "Weird Al" Yankovic
- Yoda conditions—a computer programming style
