= YODA Project =

Project to promote open data in clinical research

The YODA (Yale University Open Data Access) Project is a Yale University project to promote open data in clinical research.

The YODA Project has served as a trusted intermediary in a variety of collaborative efforts to make scientific data more broadly available to researchers. It is a response to expanding demands for health information.

The YODA Project is currently partnering with Johnson & Johnson. SI-BONE is also a partner. Inquiries for data availability for unlisted trials from these data holders can also be submitted.

This project is being examined as a pilot for a new way of sharing information.

== See also ==
- Metascience
