= The Yoddhas =

Indian non-government organisation

Yoddhas – Indians Fighting Against Cancer is a non-government organisation dedicated to the well-being of cancer patients throughout India.

It was founded in January 2014 by Rahul Yadav, in the wake of his own diagnosis with multiple myeloma. Initially, the patient-to-patient group consisted of Yadav and other patients he had met at the hospital. As of April 2015, the group has a support base of about 4,000 members. Yoddhas was created as a means to overcome a deficit of strong online support systems in the country. It is a peer-to-peer support group where everyone discusses about their illness and support each other that mainly consists of cancer patients as well as close friends and relatives of people fighting cancer.

== Objective ==
Yoddhas offers a platform for patients, doctors and Caregivers to connect and help each other. The program also tries to explore and talk about the best ways to help each other. They also promote awareness about Stem Cell Donorship. The Yoddhas support group also focuses on aiding patients with emotional, factual and psychological support. The patient group motivates and inspires each other by sharing health tips, personal stories and initiating discussions. Apart from this, it tries to generate cancer awareness among the youth by involving them in its social campaigns like Jaankari Hai To Jaan Hai", supported by 1mg.

== Activity ==
The NGO tried to bring awareness to cancer through a social media campaign called 'Happiness Week', campaigns like their hashtag #YspreadHappiness attempt to generate awareness for the cause which had a reach of 60,000 people across India. It has also collaborated with well-known institutes such as IIM Indore, Symbiosis Institute of Management Studies (SIMS) and Delhi University to carry out social awareness activities such as Nukkad Natak (street play). The group has its presence in Delhi, Mumbai, Pune, Chennai, Bengaluru and Kolkata as of January 2015.

== Recognition ==
Yoddhas – Indians Fighting Against Cancer was awarded the second prize in the Best Project category of the UNESCO Youth Citizen Entrepreneurship Competition in the year 2014, in Berlin. It also received the People's Choice Award under the Best Project's Category in the same competition.
