= Future tense =

Grammatical tense

In grammar, a future tense (abbreviated fut) is a verb form that generally marks the event described by the verb as not having happened yet, but expected to happen in the future. An example of a future tense form is the French achètera, meaning "will buy", derived from the verb acheter ("to buy"). The "future" expressed by the future tense usually means the future relative to the moment of speaking, although in contexts where relative tense is used it may mean the future relative to some other point in time under consideration.

English does not have an inflectional future tense, though it has a variety of grammatical and lexical means for expressing future-related meanings. These include modal auxiliaries such as will and shall as well as the futurate present tense.

Tenseless languages use context, lexical items, aspect and/or mood to indicate time.

== Expressions ==
The nature of the future, necessarily uncertain and at varying distances ahead, means that the speaker may refer to future events with the modality either of probability (what the speaker expects to happen) or intent (what the speaker plans to make happen). Whether future expression is realis or irrealis depends not so much on an objective ontological notion of future reality, but rather on the degree of the speaker's conviction that the event will in fact come about.

In many languages there is no grammatical (morphological or syntactic) indication of future tense. Future meaning is supplied by the context, with the use of temporal adverbs such as "later", "next year", etc. Such adverbs (in particular words meaning "tomorrow" and "then") sometimes develop into grammaticalized future tense markers. (A tense used to refer specifically to occurrences taking place on the following day is called a crastinal tense.)

In other languages, mostly of European origin, specific markers indicate futurity. These structures constitute a future tense. In many cases, an auxiliary verb is used, as in English, where futurity is often indicated by the modal auxiliary will (or shall). However, some languages combine such an auxiliary with the main verb to produce a simple (one-word, morphological) future tense. This is the origin of the future tense in Western Romance languages such as French and Italian (see below).

A given language may have more than one way to express futurity. English, for example, often refers to future events using present tense forms or other structures such as the going-to future, besides the canonical form with will/shall. In addition, the verb forms used for the future tense can also be used to express other types of meaning; English again provides examples of this (see English modal verbs for the various meanings that both will and shall can have besides simply expressing futurity).

== Germanic languages ==
In Germanic languages, including English, a common expression of the future is using the present tense, with the futurity expressed using words that imply future action (I go to Berlin tomorrow or I am going to Berlin tomorrow). There is no simple (morphological) future tense as such. However, the future can also be expressed by employing an auxiliary construction that combines certain present tense auxiliary verbs with the simple infinitive (stem) of the main verb. These auxiliary forms vary between the languages. Other, generally more informal, expressions of futurity use an auxiliary with the compound infinitive of the main verb (as with the English is going to ...).

=== English ===
English grammar provides a number of ways to indicate the future nature of an occurrence. Some argue that English, like most Germanic languages, does not have a future tense—that is, a grammatical form that always indicates futurity—nor does it have a mandatory form for the expression of futurity. However, through gradual development from its Germanic roots, English became what is now considered a strongly future-tense-marking language. Currently, there are several generally accepted ways to indicate futurity in English, and some of them—particularly those that use will or shall as the most universal and widely used—are frequently described as future tense while some may argue these verbs serve both as present modal verbs and future tense markers.

The will/shall future consists of the modal verb will or shall together with the bare infinitive of the main verb, as in "He will win" or "I shall win". (Prescriptive grammarians prefer will in the second and third persons and shall in the first person, reversing the forms to express obligation or determination, but in practice shall and will are generally used interchangeably, with will being more common. For details see shall and will.) The meaning of this construction is close to that expressed by the future tense in other languages. However the same construction with will or shall can have other meanings that do not indicate futurity, or else indicate some modality in addition to futurity (as in "He will make rude remarks," in the sense of "He is wont to make rude remarks," meaning he has a habit of doing so; or, "You shall stop making rude remarks," which is giving an order). For details of these meanings, see the sections on will and shall in the article on English modal verbs.

The form of the will/shall future described above is frequently called the simple future (or future simple). Other constructions provide additional auxiliaries that express particular aspects: the future progressive (or future continuous) as in "He will be working"; the future perfect as in "They will have finished"; and the future perfect progressive as in "You will have been practising." For detail on these, see the relevant sections of Uses of English verb forms. (For more on expressions of relative tense, such as the future perfect, see also the section above.)

Several other English constructions commonly refer to the future:

- Futurate present tense forms, as in "The trains leave at five" (meaning "The trains will leave at five"), or "My cousins arrive tomorrow" (meaning "My cousins will arrive tomorrow"). Since these grammatical forms are used more canonically to refer to present situations, they are not generally described as future tense; in sentences like those just given they may be described as "present tense with future meaning". Use of the present tense (rather than forms with will) is mandatory in some subordinate clauses referring to the future, such as "If I feel better next week, ..." and "As soon as they arrive, ...". For more details see the sections on the simple present, present progressive and dependent clauses in the article on English verb forms.
- The going-to future, e.g., "John is going to leave tonight."
- The construction with a finite form of the copula verb be together with the to-infinitive, e.g., "John is to leave tonight". (With the zero copula of newspaper headline style, this becomes simply "John to leave tonight".) For details see am to.
- The construction with to be about to, e.g., "John is about to leave", referring to the expected immediate future. (A number of lexical expressions with similar meaning also exist, such as to be on the point of (doing something).)
- Use of modal verbs with future meaning, to combine the expression of future time with certain modality: "I must do this" (also mun in Northern English dialect); "We should help him"; "I can get out of here"; "We may win"; "You might succeed". The same modal verbs are also often used with present rather than future reference. For details of their meanings and usage, see English modal verbs.

Questions and negatives are formed from all of the above constructions in the regular manner: see Questions and Negation in the English grammar article. The auxiliaries will and shall form the contracted negations won't and shan't (they can also sometimes be contracted when not negated, to 'll, such as in I'll find it).

The various ways of expressing the future carry different meanings, implying not just futurity but also aspect (the way an action or state takes place in time) and/or modality (the attitude of the speaker toward the action or state). The precise interpretation must be based on the context. In particular there is sometimes a distinction in usage between the will/shall future and the going-to future (although in some contexts they are interchangeable). For more information see the going-to future article.

=== Dutch ===
Dutch can express the future in three ways:

- gaan + infinitive: Ik ga het boek lezen (I'm going to read the book). "Gaan" is a cognate of "to go".
- zullen + infinitive: Ik zal het boek lezen (I will/shall read the book). "Zullen" is a cognate of "shall".
- present tense + context or a temporal adverb or clause: Hoe lang blijft hij in Nederland? (How long is he staying in the Netherlands?) Its English-language equivalent uses the continuous or imperfective aspect.

Zullen + infinitive is more similar to shall than to will. It is used to:

- express a promise or a proposal
- emphasize that something will certainly happen
- express that an event is likely going to take place (by explicitly mentioning the probability)

English will and Dutch wil, although cognates, have over the centuries shifted in meaning, such that will is almost identical to shall, whereas Dutch wil means want, as in Ik wil het doen (I want to do it).

Gaan + infinitive can be compared with the English "going to" . It is used:

- to express an intended action (but not a promise, proposal, or solemn plan)
- to say that an event is going to take place (without emphasizing the certainty or mentioning the probability)

=== Swedish ===
Swedish skall strongly implies intention, but with an adverb such as nog "probably" it can avoid the implication of intentionality: Det här skall nog gå bra "This will probably go well". However, the past tense of skall, skulle, can be used without such an adverb to express predictions in the past: Pelle sa, att det skulle bli varmt på eftermiddagen "Pelle said that it would be warm in the afternoon."

Pure future, regardless of intention, is usually expressed with kommer att (literally: "comes to"): Det här kommer att gå bra "This will go well", Du kommer att överleva det här "You will survive this".

Generally, future tense is sparsely used in spoken Swedish, with the verb instead being put in present tense and accompanied by a distinct time specification: Jag åker till Spanien på fredag "I travel to Spain on Friday" Då ses vi imorgon. "Then we meet tomorrow"

== Latin and Romance ==
The future tense forms in Latin varied by conjugation. Here is a sample of the future tense for the first conjugation verb amare, "to love".

amabo	I shall love
amabis	you (singular) will love
amabit	he, she, it will love
amabimus	we shall love
amabitis	you (plural) will love
amabunt	they will love

See Latin conjugation for further details. Sound changes in Vulgar Latin made future forms difficult to distinguish from other verb forms (e.g., amabit "he will love" vs. amavit "he loved"), and the Latin simple future forms were gradually replaced by periphrastic structures involving the infinitive and an auxiliary verb, such as debere, venire, velle, or especially habere. All of the modern Romance languages have grammaticalized one of these periphrastic constructions for expressing the future tense; none of them has preserved the original Latin future, with the exception of Old French preserving the original Latin future forms of estre "to be": jo (i)er, tu (i)ers, il (i)ert, nos (i)ermes, vos *(i)ertes, and il (i)erent, all of them were derived from erō, irregular future form of esse "to be", in addition to future forms in ser- (< sedēre "to sit") or estr-.

=== Future tense with habere ===
While Classical Latin used a set of suffixes to the main verb for the future tense, later Vulgar Latin adopted the use of habere ("to have") with the infinitive, as for example:

petant aut non petant venire habet ("whether they ask or do not ask, it will come")

From this construction, the major Western Romance languages have simple future tense forms that derive from the infinitive followed by a conjugated form of the verb "to have" (Latin habere). As the auxiliary verb lost its modal force (from a verb expressing obligation, desire, or intention, to a simple marker of tense), it also lost syntactic autonomy (becoming an enclitic) and phonological substance (e.g., Latin first singular habeo > ayyo > Old French ai, Modern French [e]).

Thus the sequence of Latin verbs amare habeo ("I have to love") gave rise to French aimerai, Spanish amaré, etc. "I will love".

French
Personal pronoun	Root verb	Conjugation of avoir	Future tense
je	aimer	ai	aimerai
tu	aimer	as	aimeras
il/elle/on	aimer	a	aimera
nous	aimer	avons	aimerons
vous	aimer	avez	aimerez
ils/elles	aimer	ont	aimeront

Occitan
Personal pronoun	Root verb	Conjugation of aver	Future tense
ieu	aimar	ai	aimarai
tu	aimar	as	aimaràs
el/ela/òm	aimar	a	aimarà
nos	aimar	avèm	aimarem
vos	aimar	avètz	aimaretz
eles/elas	aimar	an	aimaràn

Portuguese
Personal pronoun	Root verb	Conjugation of haver	Future tense
eu	comer	hei	comerei
tu	comer	hás	comerás
ele/ela/você	comer	há	comerá
nós	comer	hemos	comeremos
vós	comer	heis	comereis
eles/elas/vocês	comer	hão	comerão

Spanish
Personal pronoun	Root verb	Conjugation of haber	Future tense
yo	comprar	he	compraré
tú	comprar	has	comprarás
él/ella/usted	comprar	ha	comprará
nosotros	comprar	hemos/habemos	compraremos
vosotros	comprar	habéis	compraréis
ellos/ellas/ustedes	comprar	han	comprarán

Phonetic changes also affected the infinitive in the evolution of this form, so that in the modern languages the future stem is not always identical to the infinitive. Consider the following Spanish examples:

- "go out": infinitive salir → 1st. sing. future saldré in lieu of *saliré
- "know": infinitive saber → 2nd. sing future "sabrás" in lieu of *saberás
- "do": infinitive hacer → 3rd sing. future hará in lieu of *hacerá
- "want": infinitive querer → 3rd pl. future querrán in lieu of *quererán

== Slavic languages ==
Future meaning in East and West Slavic languages can be expressed using present tense form of a perfective verb (synthetic future), whereas the future tense of imperfective verbs requires an auxiliary (analytic future).

In South Slavic languages, both aspects use auxiliaries for their future tenses – modal clitics that have developed from the Old Slavic verb xotěti (will/want), influenced by common developments within Balkan languages.

Form	Example languages	Example
Perfective present with future meaning	Russian, Polish, Czech, Slovak	Russian napišu: I'll write (and finish)
Auxiliary "be" + imperfective infinitive, or l-form	Russian, Polish, Slovene	Russian budu pisat': I'll be writing
Auxiliary clitic from "want"	Bosnian, Croatian, Montenegrin, Serbian, Bulgarian, Macedonian	Croatian zalijevat ću: I'll be watering Croatian zalit ću: I'll water
Subjunctive constructions	Serbian	Serbian: ću da uradim (I'll do it)

== Indo-Aryan languages ==
=== Hindi ===
In Hindi, verbs can be conjugated for three grammatical aspects (habitual, perfective, and progressive) and five grammatical moods (indicative, presumptive, subjunctive, contrafactual, and imperative). Out of the three aspects, the habitual mood of Hindi cannot be conjugated into the future tense. The indicative future is constructed from the subjunctive future forms. Imperatives in Hindi can also be put into future tense.

==== Indicative and Subjunctive future ====
There are two future subjunctive moods in modern Hindi, first the regular subjunctive and the second, the perfective subjunctive which superficially has the same form as the perfective aspect forms of verbs but still expresses future events, it is used with if clauses and relative clauses. In a semantic analysis, this use of the perfective aspect marker would not be considered perfective, since it is more closely related to subjunctive usage. Only the superficial form is identical to that of the perfective. This perfective subjunctive cannot be used as a coupla for aspectual participles.

The future indicative forms are constructed using the future subjunctive forms of verbs by adding the future suffix गा (-gā) which declines for number and gender of the grammatical person. The table below shows the future subjunctive and indicative forms of the verb करना karnā (to do).

Future Inflection
gender	singular	plural
♂	-गा -gā	-गे -gē
♀	-गी -gī	

personal pronouns				future subjunctive	future indicative		subjunctive perfective	
person	plurality	formality	pronoun	future subjunctive	♂	♀	♂	♀
1st	singular	—	मैं ma͠i	करूँ karū̃	करूँगा karū̃gā	करूँगी karū̃gī	किया kiyā	की kī
1st	plural (Note: The 1st person plural pronoun हम (ham) is used as both the 1st person singular and 1st person plural pronoun in the eastern Hindi dialects.)	—	हम ham	करें karē̃	करेंगे karē̃gē	करेंगी karē̃gī	किये kiyē	कीं kī̃
2nd	singular	intimate (Note: The conjugations of the 2nd person intimate तू (tū) and formal आप (āp) pronouns are the same as the singular and plural demonstrative pronouns conjugations, respectively.)	तू tū	करे karē	करेगा karēgā	करेगी karēgī	किया kiyā	की kī
2nd	plural (Note: The pronouns तुम (tum) and आप (āp) are grammatically plural pronouns however, they are also used as singular pronouns, akin to the English pronoun "you".)	familiar	तुम tum	करो karo	करोगे karogē	करोगी karogī	किये kiyē	की kī
2nd	plural	formal	आप āp	करें karē̃	करेंगे karē̃gē	करेंगी karē̃gī	किये kiyē	कीं kī̃
translation (only 2nd person)				(that) you do.	you will do.		(if) you do.	

demonstrative pronouns (Note: Hindi doesn't have pronouns in the third person and the demonstrative pronouns double as the third person pronouns when they not have a noun argument.)				future subjunctive	future indicative		subjunctive perfective	
plurality	usage	proximal	distal	future subjunctive	♂	♀	♂	♀
singular	literary	यह yah	वह vah	करे karē	करेगा karēgā	करेगी karēgī	किया kiyā	की kī
singular	colloquial	ये ye	वो vo	करे karē	करेगा karēgā	करेगी karēgī	किया kiyā	की kī
singular	colloquial	ये ye	वो vo	करे karē	करेगा karēgā	करेगी karēgī	किया kiyā	की kī
plural	colloquial	ये ye	वो vo	करें karē̃	करेंगे karē̃gē	करेंगी karē̃gī	किये kiyē	कीं kī̃
plural	literary	ये ye	वे ve	करें karē̃	करेंगे karē̃gē	करेंगी karē̃gī	किये kiyē	कीं kī̃
translation (only 3rd person fem.)				(that) she do.	she will do.		(if) she does.	

==== Prospective future ====
The prospective future is constructed using the prospective future participle which is constructed from the oblique infinitive by adding the suffix वाला (-vālā) which also declines for the number and the gender of the pronoun. The participle is always followed by the auxiliary verb होना (honā) in its conjugated forms. The copula होना (honā) can be put into four grammatical moods: indicative, presumptive, subjunctive, and contrafactual. The table below shows the indicative mood forms of the prospective future for the verb करना karnā (to do).

Prospective Future Inflection
gender	singular	plural
♂	-नेवला -nēvālā	-नेवाले -nēvālē
♀	-नेवाली -nēvālī	

personal pronouns				indicative mood					
personal pronouns				present		imperfect past		future	
person	plurality	formality	pronoun	♂	♀	♂	♀	♂	♀
1st	singular	—	मैं ma͠i	करनेवाला हूँ karnēvālā hū̃	करनेवाली हूँ karnēvālī hū̃	करनेवाला था karnēvālā thā	करनेवाली थी karnēvālī thī	करनेवाला रहूँगा karnēvālā rahū̃gā	करनेवाली रहूँगी karnēvālī rahū̃gī
1st	plural	—	हम ham	करनेवाले हैं karnēvālē ha͠i	करनेवाली हैं karnēvālī ha͠i	करनेवाले थे karnēvālē thē	करनेवाली थीं karnēvālī thī̃	करनेवाले रहेंगे karnēvālē rahẽge	करनेवाली रहेंगी karnevālī rahẽgī
2nd	singular	intimate	तू tū	करनेवाला है karnēvālā hai	करनेवाली है karnēvālī hai	करनेवाला था karnēvālā thā	करनेवाली थी karēvālī thī	करनेवाला रहेगा karnēvālā rahegā	करनेवाली रहेगी karnēvālī rahegī
2nd	plural	familiar	तुम tum	करनेवाले हो karnēvālē ho	करनेवाली हो karnēvālī ho	करनेवाले थे karnēvālē thē	करनेवाली थी karnēvālī thī	करनेवाले रहोगे karnēvālē rahogē	करनेवाली रहोगी karnēvālī rahogī
2nd	plural	formal	आप āp	करनेवाले हैं karnēvālē ha͠i	करनेवाली हैं karnēvālī ha͠i	करनेवाले थे karnēvālē thē	करनेवाली थीं karnēvālī thī̃	करनेवाले रहेंगे karnēvālē rahẽge	करनेवाली रहेंगी karnevālī rahẽgī
translation				...is going to do.		...was going to do.		...will be going to do.	

==== Imperative future ====
Imperatives in Hindi can be conjugated into two tenses, present and future tense. The conjugations are mentioned in the table below for the verb करना karnā (to do). Hindi also has imperatives forms which are constructed form the subjunctive form of the verbs for the formal 2nd person pronoun आप (āp), and also third person pronouns to give indirect commands.

pronouns			imperative mood		subjunctive mood	
pronouns			present	future	present	future
2nd	intimate	तू tū	कर kar	करियो kariyo	—	
2nd	familiar	तुम tum	करो karo	करना karnā	—	
2nd	formal	आप āp	करिये kariyē	करियेगा kariyēgā	करें karẽ	
translation			do!	do (later)!	(please) do!	

== Semitic languages ==
=== Hebrew ===
Biblical Hebrew has a distinction between past and future tenses which is similar in form to those used in other Semitic languages such as Arabic and Aramaic. Gesenius refers to the past and future verb forms as Perfect and Imperfect, respectively, separating completed action from uncompleted action. However, the usage of verbs in these forms does not always have the same temporal meaning as in Indo-European languages, mainly due to the common use of a construct of inverting the time reference with a prefix "Waw consecutive" (ו' ההיפוך). With this construct, the Perfect-consecutive refers to the future and the Imperfect-consecutive refers to the past.

Usage of the imperfect to discuss future events is somewhat uncommon in Biblical Hebrew, as the Bible mainly discusses past events. It can be found in quoted speech, such as in the words of Moses (imperfect verbs stressed):

^{1}וַיַּעַן מֹשֶׁה, וַיֹּאמֶר, וְהֵן לֹא-יַאֲמִינוּ לִי, וְלֹא יִשְׁמְעוּ בְּקֹלִי: כִּי יֹאמְרוּ, לֹא-נִרְאָה אֵלֶיךָ יְהֹוָה

^{1}And Moses answered and said, But, behold, they will not believe me, nor hearken unto my voice: for they will say, The LORD hath not appeared unto thee.

— Exodus 4:1

The Perfect-consecutive is commonly found in prophetic text, describing an unspecified future, as in the Book of Isaiah:

^{2}וְהָיָה בְּאַחֲרִית הַיָּמִים, נָכוֹן יִהְיֶה הַר בֵּית-יְהוָה בְּרֹאשׁ הֶהָרִים, וְנִשָּׂא, מִגְּבָעוֹת; וְנָהֲרוּ אֵלָיו, כָּל-הַגּוֹיִם.

^{2} In the last days the mountain of the Lord’s temple will be established as the highest of the mountains; it will be exalted above the hills, and all nations will stream to it.

— Isaiah 2:2

Modern Hebrew always employs the imperfect as the future tense (and the perfect as the past tense). The usage of "Waw consecutive" has practically disappeared, except for quotes from the Bible and Poetic language.

=== Arabic ===
To form future tense in Arabic the prefix (سـ) "sa" is added to the present tense verb, or (سوف) "sawfa".

For example, consider the sentence:

Akulu tuffahan
eat.1SG apples
I eat apples

To express the future we have two ways:

written as part of the verb

Saakulu tuffahan
FUT-eat.1SG apples
I will eat apples

written as a clitic to indicate the future but preceding the verb

Sawfa akulu tuffahan
FUT eat.1SG apples
I will eat apples

In Classical Arabic the latter indicates an individual future action that usually takes place further in the future than the first mentioned form, which is usually used with verbs that relate to other actions, and mostly referring to rather near future actions. However, in Modern Standard Arabic (MSA) the distinction is minimal.

Moreover, the indication of the future tense in dialectal Arabic is quite varied from one dialect to the next. Generally speaking, the words meaning "want to" (بدي / أريد أن), "go to" (أروح), "intend to"(ناوي /نويت), and many others are used daily to indicate future actions. In Moroccan Arabic, the word "Ghad" (غاد) is used to indicate future, which literally means "there" (or there is to happen), that is in some way similar to the English formation "there I go.."

== Mandarin Chinese ==
Mandarin Chinese has no grammatical tense, instead indicating time of action from the context or using adverbs. However, the auxiliary verb 會 / 会 - huì / ㄏㄨㄟˋ, a modal meaning "can", "know how", can alternatively indicate futurity. For lexical futurity, the word 要 yào, which can serve as a verb meaning "to want", can also serve as an adverb meaning "immediately": For example, 我要洗澡 wǒ yào xǐzǎo can mean either "I want to bathe" or "I am about to bathe". 即 jí、將 jiāng serve a similar function as tense-marking adverbs.

== Creoles ==
Creoles are languages with a vocabulary heavily based on a superstrate language but a grammar based on substrate languages and/or universal language tendencies. Some Creoles model a future tense/irrealis mood marker on "go" from the superstrate (analogous to English "am going to"). In many creoles the future can be indicated with the progressive aspect, analogous to the English "I'm seeing him tomorrow." In general creoles tend to put less emphasis on marking tense than on marking aspect. When any of tense, aspect, and modality are specified, they are typically indicated with invariant pre-verbal markers in the sequence anterior relative tense (prior to the time focused on), irrealis mode (conditional or future), imperfective aspect.

=== Jamaican English Creole ===
The future marker in Jamaican Creole is /de go/ or /a go/: /de go hapm/ "is going to happen", /mi a go ɹon/ "I am going to run".

=== Belizean Creole English ===
In Belizean Creole, the future tense is indicated by a mandatory invariant pre-verbal particle /(w)a(n)/, /gwein/, or /gouɲ/.

=== Gullah ===
In Gullah the future is indicated by the pre-verbal marker gwine: Uh gwine he'p dem "I'm going to help them".

=== Hawaiian Creole English ===
In Hawaiian Creole, the pre-verbal future marker is gon: Ai gon bai wan pikap "I'm going to buy a pickup".

=== Haitian Creole ===
Haitian Creole, based on a French superstrate, interchangeably uses pral or va (from French 3rd person singular va "goes") pre-verbally to indicate the future: Mwen va fini lit. "I go finish"; Li pral vini jodi a "He will come today".
