= Jodha Bai =

Jodha bai, short summary description

Jodha Bai or Jodh Bai may refer to:

- Mariam-uz-Zamani or Jodha Bai, chief Rajput wife and principal consort of Mughal emperor Akbar
  - Jodha Bai Mahal, residential palace of Mughal empress Mariam-uz-Zamani in Fatehpur Sikri
  - Begum Shahi Mosque, built by her in Lahore
- Jagat Gosain or Jodh Bai (1573–1619), who was given the posthumous title of Bilqis Makani by Jahangir
