= Otomi grammar =

Grammar of the Otomi language

The grammar of the Otomi language displays a mixture of elements of synthetic and analytic structures. Particularly the phrase-level morphology is synthetic, whereas the sentence-level is analytic. Simultaneously, the language is head-marking in terms of its verbal morphology, but not in its nominal morphology, which is more analytic. Otomi recognizes three large open word classes of nouns, verbs, and particles. There is a small closed class of property words, variously analyzed as adjectives or stative verbs.

According to the most-common analysis, the Otomi language has two kinds of bound morphemes, proclitics and affixes. Proclitics differ from affixes mainly in their phonological characteristics – they are marked for tone and block nasal harmony. Some authors consider proclitics to be better analyzed as prefixes. Orthographically, the standard orthography writes proclitics as separate words, whereas affixes are written joined to their host root. Most affixes are suffixes and with few exceptions occur only on verbs, whereas the proclitics occur both in nominal and verbal paradigms. Proclitics mark the categories of definiteness and number, person, negation, tense and aspect – often fused in a single proclitic. Suffixes mark direct and indirect objects, as well as clusivity (the distinction between inclusive and exclusive we), number, location and affective emphasis. Historically, as in other Oto-Manguean languages, the basic word order is verb–subject–object (VSO), but some dialects tend towards subject–verb–object (SVO) word order, probably under influence from Spanish. Possessive constructions use the order possessed-possessor but modificational constructions use modifier-head order.

== Transcription ==
The phonemic orthography employed for writing Otomi in this article is the one used by Lastra (1992 and 2005). It includes tones in order to be maximally informative, but many practical orthographies used by Otomi speakers do not include information about tone. The symbols used to write the tones in the examples are acute accent /´/ for high tone, and circumflex accent /^/ for ascending tone; low tone is left unmarked. The symbols used for the four nasal vowels are /į, ę, ą, ų/. The consonant symbols: /c/ denotes IPA [t͡s], /y/ denotes IPA [j]. The remaining symbols are from the IPA with their original values.

== Pronominal system ==
The pronominal system of most Otomi varieties distinguish four persons: first inclusive and exclusive, second and third, and three numbers singular, dual and plural. The system below is from the Toluca dialect.

	Singular	Dual	Plural
1st-person incl.	nugó "I"	nugó-bé "you and I"	nugó-hé "I and you guys"
1st-person excl.	nugó "I"	nugó-wí "we two (not you)"	nugó-hɨ´ "We all (not you)"
2nd-person	nukʔígé "you"	nukʔígé-wí "you two"	nukʔígé-gɨ´ "you guys"
3rd-person	gégé "she/he/it"	nugégé-wí "the two of them"	nugégé-hɨ´ "they"

== Nouns ==
Otomi nouns are inflected for possession, and for diminutive. The particular pattern of possessive inflection is widespread throughout the Mesoamerican Linguistic Area. A possessed noun is prefixed with a morpheme agreeing in person with the possessor. If the possessor is plural or dual, the noun is also marked with a suffix agreeing with the possessor's number. Below is given the inflectional paradigm for the word /ngų́/ "house" in the dialect of Toluca.

	Singular	Dual	Plural
1st-person excl.	mą-ngų́ "my house"	mą-ngų́-bé "Our house (me and him/her)"	mą-ngų́-hé "Our house (me and them)"
1st-person incl.	mą-ngų́ "my house"	mą-ngų́-wí "Our house (me and you)"	mą-ngų́-hɨ́ "Our house (me and you and them)"
2nd-person	ri-ngų́ "your house"	ri-ngų́-wí "you two's house"	ri-ngų́-hɨ́ "you guys' house"
3rd-person	rʌ-ngų́ "her/his/its house"	yʌ-ngų́-wí "the house of the two of them"	yʌ-ngų́-hɨ́ "their house"

To express plurality of a possessed noun, a periphrastic construction is used.

kʔɨ mą-ngų́
those I-house
"my houses"

Possession can also be emphatic, in which case it adds an emphatic suffix -gó (first person) -gé (second person) or -gégé (third person) and adds as a prefix the word mɛhti "possession".

ni rʌ ʔbɛ̂cʔé mą-mɛ́hti-gó-ní
that the basket I-possession-me-that
"that basket is mine"

ni rʌ ʔbɛ̂cʔé rʌ-mɛ́hti-gégé-ní
that the basket He/she-possession-her/him-that
"that basket is his/hers"

The diminutive is inflected by a prefix ci-

ci-nú
DIM-house
"little house"

=== Articles ===
Plurality of nouns is expressed with articles preceding the noun, rʌ "the (singular)" or yʌ "the (dual/plural)":

Singular	Dual	Plural
rʌ ngų́ "the house"	yʌ yóho ngų́ "the two houses"	yʌ ngų́ "the houses"

In addition to the simple plural/singular articles, the Classical Otomi language as described by Cárceres distinguished honorific and pejorative articles. In classical Otomi, the articles were ąn "neutral singular", e (neutral and honorific plural), nø̂ (pejorative singular) yo (pejorative plural) and o (honorific singular).

ąn ngų́ "the house"

nø̂ ngų́ "the damn house"

o ngų́ "the honored house"

== Verbs ==
On verbs, all of the categories of person of subject, tense, aspect and mood are marked by the means of a single prefix on each verb. In Otomi of Toluca and of Ixtenco, the categories distinguished are present, preterit, perfect, imperfect, future, pluperfect, two different subjunctives, present and past continuative and imperative. Mezquital Otomi has additional moods. On transitive verbs, person of the object is inflected by a suffix. If either subject or object is dual or plural, it is shown with a plural suffix following the object suffix.

The structure of the Otomi verb is as follows:

Person of subject/T/A/M	Misc. prefix (e.g. adverbial)	Root	Object suffix	Plural/Dual suffix

=== Person, number, tense, aspect and mood ===
The present tense prefixes are di- (first person), gi- (second person), and i- (third person).

	Singular	Dual	Plural
1st-person excl.	di-nú "I see"	di-nú-bé "we see (me and him/her)"	di-nú-hé "we see (me and them)"
1st-person incl.	di-nú "I see"	di-nú-wí "We see(me and you)"	di-nú-hɨ´ "We see (me and you and them)"
2nd-person	gi-nú "you see"	gi-nú-wí "You two see"	gi-nú-hɨ´ "You guys see"
3rd-person	i-nú "she/he/it sees"	i-nú-wí "the two of them see"	i-nú-hɨ´ "they see"

The preterit uses the prefixes do-, go- and bi-, perfect uses to-, ko-, ʃi-, imperfect uses dimá, gimá, mi, future uses go-, gi- and da- and pluperfect tamą-, kimą-, kamą-. All tenses use the same suffixes for dual and plural numbers and clusivity as the present tense; from here on only the singular forms will be given. The difference between preterit and imperfect is similar to the distinction between the preterit in Spanish habló "he spoke (punctual)" and the imperfect hablaba "he spoke/He used to speak/he was speaking (non-punctual)".

	Preterit	Perfect	Imperfect	Future tense	Pluperfect
1st-person singular	do-nú "I saw (punctual)"	to-nú "I have seen"	dimá-nú "I saw (non-punctual)"	go-nú "I will see"	tamą-nú "I had seen"
2nd-person singular	go-nú "you saw (punctual)"	ko-nú "you have seen"	gimá-nú "you saw (non-punctual)"	gi-nú "you will see"	kimą-nú "you had seen"
3rd-person singular	bi-nú "she/he/it saw (punctual)"	ʃi-nú "she/he/it has seen"	mi-nú "you saw (non-punctual)"	da-nú "she/he/it will see"	kamą-nú "she/he/it had seen"

In Toluca Otomi, the semantic differences between the two subjunctive forms (A and B) are not easily defined; according to Lastra, sometimes subjunctive B has a meaning that is more recent in time than subjunctive A. Both have the meaning of something counterfactual. However, in other Otomi varieties, e.g. Otomi of Ixtenco Tlaxcala, the distinction between the two forms is one of subjunctive vs. irrealis. The past and present progressive are similar in meaning to English was and is X-ing respectively. The imperative is for issuing direct orders.

	Subjunctive A	Subjunctive B	Present progressive	Past progressive	Imperative
1st-person singular	(n)gwa-nú "I would have seen"	kwa-nú "I would have seen"	drʌ-nú "I am seeing"	ndrʌ-nú "I was seeing"	*
2nd-person singular	(n)gwi-nú "you would have seen"	kwi-nú "you would have seen"	grʌ-nú "you are seeing"	dgrʌ-nú "you were seeing"	nú "See!"
3rd-person singular	(n)di-nú "she/he/it would have seen"	trʌ-nú "she/he/it would have seen"	rʌ-nú "she/he/it is seeing"	mbrʌ-nú "she/he/it was seeing"	*

Verbs expressing movement towards the speaker such as ʔįhį "come" use a different set of prefixes for marking person/T/A/M. These prefixes can also be used with other verbs to express "to do something while coming this way". In Toluca Otomi, mba- is the third-person singular imperfect prefix for movement verbs.

mba-tųhų
3SG.MOV.IPFV-sing
"he came singing"

To form predicates from nouns, the subject prefixes are simply added to the noun root:

drʌ-môkhá
1SG.PRS.CONT-priest
"I am a priest"

=== Transitivity and stative verbs ===
Transitive verbs are inflected for agreement with their objects by means of suffixes, while using the same subject prefixes as the intransitive verbs to agree with their agents. However, in all dialects a few intransitive verbs take the object suffix instead of the subject prefix; usually these intransitive verbs are stative, i.e. describing a state. This has led to the interpretation that in Otomi, morphosyntactic alignment is split between active–stative and accusative systems.

In Toluca Otomi, the object suffixes are -gí (first person), -kʔí (second person) and -bi (third person), but the vowel /i/ may harmonize to /e/ when suffixed to a root containing /e/. The first-person suffix is realized as -kí after sibilants and after certain verb roots, and -hkí when used with certain other verbs. The second-person object suffix may sometimes metathesise to -ʔkí. The third-person suffix also has the allomorphs -hpí/-hpé, -pí, -bí, and sometimes third-person objects are marked with a zero morpheme.

1st-person object	2nd-person object	3rd-person object
bi-ñús-kí he/past-write-1.OBJ "he wrote me"	bi-ñús-kʔí he/past-write-2.OBJ "he wrote you"	bi-kré-bi he/past-believe-3.OBJ "he believed it"
bi-nú-gí he/past-see-1.OBJ "he saw me"	bi-nú-kʔí he/past-see-2.OBJ "he saw you"	bi-hkwáhti-bí he/she/past-hit-3.OBJ "she/he hit him/her"

Plural and dual number of objects is marked by the same suffixes as the subject, in some cases leading to ambiguity about the respective numbers of subject and object. With object suffixes of the first or second persons sometimes the verbal root changes, often dropping final vowels.

dual object/subject	plural object/subject
bi- ñaʃ -kʔí -wí he/PAST- {cut hair} -you -DU "the two of them cut your hair" or "he cut the hair of the two of you"	bi- ñaʃ -kí -hɨ´ he/PAST- {cut hair} -you -PL "they cut my hair" or "he cut our hair"

A class of words that describe properties or states has been described either as adjectives or as stative verbs. This word class consists of words with a meaning of attributing a property to an entity, e.g. "the man is tall", "the house is old". Within this class, some roots use the normal subject/T/A/M prefixes, while others always use the object suffixes to encode the person of the patient or subject. The use of the same suffixes that are used to encode the patient/objects of transitive verbs to encode the patient/subject of the predicate has been interpreted as a trait of split intransitivity. This phenomenon occurs in all dialects, but which stative verbs the object prefixes, and how many take, vary between dialects. In Toluca Otomi, most stative verbs are conjugated using a set of suffixes similar to the object/patient suffixes and a third-person subject prefix, while only a few use the present continuative subject prefixes. The following examples of the two kinds of stative verb conjugation in Toluca Otomi.

with patient/object suffix	with subject/agent prefix
rʌ- nô- hkʔí it/PRS- fat- me "I am fat"	drʌ- dôtʔî I/PRS/CONT- short "I am short"

=== Other affixes ===
Most Otomi varieties also allow different kinds of adverbial meanings to be inflected on the verb.

From Toluca Otomi, examples of adverbial affixes are:

bí- An evidential prefix used about progressive events being witnessed by the speaker (It only exists in third person singular)

kʔʌ rʌ ʃùa ya bì-pɛphí
"Juan is working now (I see)" (Indicative the Juan now bí-work)

ga- A prefix expressing two simultaneous events or one event immediately preceding another. Also has the second person ngo-

bɨ ga-thô {rʌ-tá mbrʌ-mí-thó}
when ga-pass.by 3/PAST/CONT-sit-COMPL
"When his father came by he was already sitting"

ndɨ- A prefix expressing that something was done well or a lot.

do-ndɨ-chú
1/PRF-ndɨ-scared
"I got really scared"

Other affixes express inchoative aspect, instrumental function or purpose. There is also a suffix with the meaning of "meanwhile".

== Syntax ==
Some dialects have SVO as the most frequent word order, for example Otomi of Toluca and of San Ildefonso, Querétaro, but other dialects such as Mezquital Otomi have VSO as the basic, pragmatically unmarked word order. Proto-Otomi is also thought to have had VSO order as verb-initial order is the most frequent basic word order in other Oto-Manguean languages. It has been reported that some Otomi dialects are shifting from verb initial to a subject-initial basic word order under influence from Spanish. Interrogative particles occur sentence initially conditional classes follow the conclusion. Relative clauses follow the noun.

== Literature ==
- Hekking, Ewald; Dik Bakker (2007). "The Case of Otomí: A contribution to grammatical borrowing in crosslinguistic perspective". In Yaron Matras; Jeanette Sakel (eds.). Grammatical borrowing in cross-linguistic perspective. Walter de Gruyter. ISBN 978-3-11-019628-3.
- Lastra, Yolanda (2000). "Otomí language shift and some recent efforts to reverse it". In Joshua Fishman (ed.). Can threatened languages be saved? Reversing Language Shift, Revisited: A 21st Century Perspective. Multilingual Matters Ltd. ISBN 1-85359-492-X.
- Lastra, Yolanda (2001). Unidad y diversidad de la lengua. Relatos otomíes (in Spanish). Universidad Nacional Autonoma de México, Instituto de investigaciones Antropológicas. ISBN 968-36-9509-4.
- Lastra, Yolanda (1998). Ixtenco Otomí. Lincom. ISBN 3-929075-15-6.
- Lastra, Yolanda (2006). Los Otomies – Su lengua y su historia (in Spanish). Universidad Nacional Autonoma de México, Instituto de investigaciones Antropológicas. ISBN 970-32-3388-0.
- Lastra, Yolanda (1992). El Otomí de Toluca (in Spanish). Universidad Nacional Autonoma de México, Instituto de investigaciones Antropológicas. ISBN 968-36-2260-7.
- Lastra, Yolanda (1989). Otomi de San Andrés Cuexcontitlan, Estado de México (PDF) (in Spanish). Archivo de Lenguas Indígenas. ISBN 968-12-0411-5.
- Lastra, Yolanda (1996). "Verbal Morphology of Ixtenco Otomi" (PDF). Amerindia. 21: 1–8.
- Palancar, Enrique L. (2008). "Emergence of Active/Stative alignment in Otomi". In Mark Donohue; Søren Wichmann (eds.). in The Typology of Semantic Alignment. Oxford University Press US. ISBN 978-0-19-923838-5.
- Palancar, Enrique L. (2006). "Property in Otomi: a language with no adjectives". International Journal of American Linguistics. 72 (3): 325–66. doi:10.1086/509489. S2CID 144634622.
- Palancar, Enrique L. (2006). "Intransitivity and the origins of middle voice in Otomi". Linguistics. 44 (3): 613–643. doi:10.1515/ling.2006.020. S2CID 144073740.
- Voigtlander, Katherine; Artemisa Echegoyen (1985). Luces Contemporaneas del Otomi: Grámatica del Otomi de la Sierra (in Spanish). Mexico, D.F.: Instituto Lingüístico de Verano.
- Palancar, Enrique L. (2008). "Juxtaposed Adjunct Clauses in Otomi: Expressing Both Depictive and Adverbial Semantics". International Journal of American Linguistics. 74 (3): 365–392. doi:10.1086/590086. S2CID 144994029.
- Palancar, Enrique L. (2007). "Cutting and breaking verbs in Otomi: An example of lexical specification". Cognitive Linguistics. 18 (2): 307–317. doi:10.1515/COG.2007.018. S2CID 145122834.
- Palancar, Enrique L. (2004). "Verbal Morphology and Prosody in Otomi". International Journal of American Linguistics. 70 (3): 251–78. doi:10.1086/425601. S2CID 143924185.
