= Verb–object–subject word order =

Basic word order type

In linguistic typology, a verb–object–subject or verb–object–agent language, commonly abbreviated VOS or VOA, is one in which most sentences arrange their elements in that order. That would be the equivalent in English to "Ate apples Sam" to mean "Sam ate apples". The relatively rare default word order accounts for only 3% of the world's languages. It is the fourth-most common default word order among the world's languages out of the six. It is a more common default permutation than OVS and OSV but is significantly rarer than SOV (as in Hindi and Japanese), SVO (as in English and Mandarin), and VSO (as in Filipino and Irish). Families in which all or many of their languages are VOS include the following:

- the Algonquian family (including Ojibwa)
- the Arawakan family (including Baure and Terêna)
- the Austronesian family (including Dusun, Malagasy, Toba Batak, Tukang Besi, Palauan, Gilbertese, Fijian and Tsou)
- the Chumash family (including Inoseño Chumash)
- the Mayan family (including Huastec, Yucatec, Mopán, Lacondón, Chol, Tzeltal, Tzotzil, Chuj, Tojolabal, Cakchiquel, Tzutujil, Sacapultec, Pocomam, Pocomchí and Kekchi)
- the Otomanguean family (including Mezquital Otomi and Highland Otomi)
- the Salishan family (including Coeur d'Alene and Twana)

== Incidence ==
Order	Example	Usage	Languages
SOV	"Sam apples ate."	45%	Ainu, Akkadian, Amharic, Ancient Greek, Armenian, Aymara, Bambara, Basque, Bengali, Burmese, Burushaski, Chukchi, Cushitic languages, Dravidian languages, Elamite, Hindustani, Hittite, Hopi, Itelmen, Japanese, Korean, Kurdish, Kurukh, Latin, Lhasa Tibetan, Manchu, Mongolian, Munda languages, Nahuatl, Navajo, Nepali, Nivkh, Northeast Caucasian languages, Northwest Caucasian languages, Pali, Pashto, Persian, Quechua, Sanskrit, Sinhala, Siouan-Catawban languages, Tamil, Tigrinya, Turkic languages, Yukaghir
SVO	"Sam ate apples."	42%	Arabic (modern spoken varieties), Chinese (Mandarin, Cantonese, etc.), English, Estonian, Finnish, Hausa, Hebrew, Indonesian, Kashmiri, Malay, most European languages, Pa'O, Swahili, Thai, Vietnamese, Yucatec Maya
VSO	"Ate Sam apples."	9%	Arabic (classical and modern standard), Berber languages, Biblical Hebrew, Celtic languages, Filipino, Geʽez, Kariri, Mayan languages, Polynesian languages
VOS	"Ate apples Sam."	3%	Algonquian languages, Arawakan languages, Car, Chumash, Fijian, K'iche, Malagasy, Otomanguean languages, Qʼeqchiʼ, Salishan languages, Terêna
OVS	"Apples ate Sam."	1%	Äiwoo, Hixkaryana, Urarina
OSV	"Apples Sam ate."	0%	Haida, Tobati, Warao
Frequency distribution of word order in languages surveyed by Russell S. Tomlin in the 1980s

=== Typology ===
VOS word order is the fourth-most-common of the world's languages, and has verb-initial word order, like VSO. Very few languages have a fixed VOS word order, most primarily in the Austronesian and Mayan language families. Many verb-initial languages exhibit a flexible word order (such as St’át’imcets, Chamorro, and Tongan), alternating between VOS and VSO. VOS and VSO are usually classified as verb-initial because they share many similar properties, such as the absence of the verb "have" and predicate-initial grammar.

Though not as universal, many verb-initial languages also have ergative clauses. For instance, most Mayan languages have an ergative-absolutive system of verb agreement and some Austronesian languages have an ergative-absolutive system of case marking (see also symmetrical voice).

== Occurrence ==
VOS occurs in many languages, including Austronesian languages (such as Malagasy, Old Javanese, Toba Batak, Dusun, and Fijian), Mayan languages (such as Kaqchikel and Tzotzil), and even Assyrian Neo-Aramaic, the last of which has a very free word order with inversions.

In Hadza, the default order is VSO, but VOS is very common as well. This is also the case for some Salishan languages.

In Arabic, the typical order is VSO, but VOS is an option and in some sentences mandatory.

=== Arabic (special cases) ===
Classical Arabic has free word order due to its use of case endings to mark grammatical case, but VSO sentences are the default. Modern Standard Arabic is more likely to use SVO order (under the influence of colloquial varieties which prefer or require it due to the loss of case endings). However, VOS order is sometimes used in both Classical and Modern Standard Arabic in special cases.

The first table (note that Arabic is written from right to left) will illustrate the SVO form of the sentence, the second table will illustrate the VSO form, and the third table will illustrate the VOS form:

الدرس قرأ المعلم
ad-darsa qaraʾa al-muʿallimu
DEF-lesson PST-read-3SG DEF-teacher
Object Verb Subject
The teacher read the lesson

الدرس المعلم قرأ
ad-darsa al-muʿallimu qaraʾa
DEF-lesson DEF-teacher PST-read-3SG
Object Subject Verb
The teacher read the lesson

المعلم الدرس قرأ
al-muʿallimu ad-darsa qaraʾa
DEF-teacher DEF-lesson PST-read-3SG
Subject Object Verb
The teacher read the lesson

The first table is meant to give a basic understanding of the general form of sentences in Arabic.

The second table displays a VSO sentence in which the verb appears at the beginning of the sentence and is followed by the subject and the object. Such a sentence is produced by moving the verb to the empty CP, which is the sister of the IP, and results in the production from SVO to VOS. The subject (the teacher) uses the nominative case, and the object (the lesson) uses the accusative case.

The third table displays a VOS sentence. At first glance, that process seems very similar to the VSO word order, but the reality is rather different. Rather than the V moving forward, the S actually moves from the beginning position of SVO to the end position of VOS. That is because of a process known as subject adjunction in which the subject may be unmentioned. Here is an example of subject adjunction:

Context: *The teacher has taught a class and read a specific lesson. Both speakers are wary that either a male or female teacher read a specific lesson.

Question: "Who read the lesson?

Response: He read the lesson/The teacher read the lesson

Based on the context provided, both speakers are wary of a specific lesson taking place and refer to a set of entities being a male and a female teacher. To differentiate between both entities, the use of an anaphoric expression matching in gender results in the capability to differentiate between them. One of the qualities of Arabic verbal morphology is the immediate integration of gender and plurality in the verb. As a result, the subject no longer needs to be mentioned since there is an anaphora attached to the verb. Since the subject has been moved to the end of the sentence, the property of extended projection principle must be fulfilled since there is no specifier. The specifier of the inflectional phrase is thus PRO. The subject (the teacher) uses the nominative case, and the object (the lesson) uses an accusative case.

=== Baure ===
Baure is an Arawakan language that also follows verb-initial word order. One of Baure's primary features is the importance in agreement of phi features. This example illustrates not only the verb-object-subject order but also the affixes for each verb:

Pi-am-ri wapoeri-ye pi=kowyo-čo ti monči
2SG=take=3SG.F river-LOC 2SG=bath-APPL dem1.F child
V-transitive Object V-transitive {} Subject
Take her to the river and bathe the child.

That sentence displays a transitive verb with markers, indicating agreement in phi features for the subject and the object. The analysis of each affix is as follows:

1. Pi (1): The "Pi" refers to the second-person singular, indicating that the sentence involves direct conversation. One may assume that the person being identified is "you."
2. Ri: The "Ri" refers to a third-person entity that is feminine. The sentence states "take her to the..." and so the "Ri" acts like the pronoun "her."
3. Pi (2): The "Pi" of the second word refers to the same person with whom is directly conversed, "you."
4. Čo: The "čo" refers to the applied form since it matches the suffix of the first verb, which refers to "her." However, in the sentence, it contributes to no semantic meaning.

=== Cantonese (special cases) ===
Despite being a SVO language, there is evidence to suggest that Cantonese uses VOS word order in some cases, such as in casual speech or relative clauses.

==== Relative clause ====
Unlike English, which places a relative clause (RC) after the head noun that it modifies, Cantonese is very unusual among SVO languages by placing relative clauses before head nouns and by having prenominal relative clauses, which cause a VOS word order, as is seen in most subject-gapped relative clauses. Object-gapped relative clauses do not follow a VOS word order.

Subject-gapped RCs and object-gapped RCs in English:

Subject-gapped RC:

Sentence	The	mouse	that's	kissing	the	chicken
Parts	Subject			Verb		Object
Head Noun and RC Gap	Head noun		Relative Clause			

The head noun, "mouse," is placed before the relative clause (postnominal RC) in a subject-gapped RC in English. That is not the case in Cantonese and Mandarin in which head nouns are always placed after the RC (prenominal RC).

Object-gapped RC:

Sentence	The	chicken	that	the	mouse's	kissing
Parts	Object				Subject	Verb
Head Noun and RC Gap	Head noun		Relative Clause			

In object-gapped RCs, the object is placed before the relative clause in English.

===== Example of subject-gapped RC in Cantonese =====
Gloss	錫 公雞 sek3 {gung1 gai1} kiss chicken Verb Object	嗰 隻 老鼠 go2 zek3 {lou5 syu2} that CL mouse {} {} Subject
Head Noun and RC Gap	Relative Clause	Head Noun
Translation	The mouse that kisses the chicken.	

A subject-gapped RC behaves differently in Cantonese from English by being after the head noun (prenominal RC), which always yields a VOS order. It is extremely rare for SVO languages to adopt a prenominal RC structure. In a sample of 756 languages, only 5 languages have that VOS combination (less than 0.01%), one of which is Cantonese.

==== Casual speech ====
In casual speech, Cantonese-speakers often produce a VOS sentence in answering a question.

===== Example =====
Here is a typical response for a question such as "你食咗飯未呀?", which translates to "did you eat yet?" in English.

Sentence	食	咗	飯	啦	我
Romanization	sik6	zo2	faan6	laa1	ngo5
Gloss	ate		rice	sentence-final particle	me
Parts	Verb		Object		Subject
Translation	I ate rice.				

=== Ch'ol ===
Ch'ol is another ergative Mayan language that is one of the Ch'olan-Tseltalan and has VOS as its basic word order. Subjects, objects, and possessors (nominal arguments) may be omitted.

Tyi i-kuch-u si` aj-Maria
PFV 3-SG.ERG-carry-TR wood DET-Maria
{} {Verb (transitive)} Object Subject
Maria carried wood.

Clemens and Coon propose that the language has three paths that motivate three types of VOS clauses:

1. Subjects contained in the high topic position after the verbs
2. Phonologically-heavy subjects are NP-shifted
3. Bare NP objects undergo prosodic reordering

Ch'ol objects in a VOS order are generally not full DPs, or the sentence is ungrammatical. The order is derived as VSO if the object is a full DP, as is shown in the table:

Tyi i-kuch-u aj-Maria ili si`
PFV 3-SG.ERG-carry-SS CLF-Maria DEM wood
{} V S {} O
Maria carried this wood.

If the postverbal argument in the example above were a bare NP (without a determiner), instead of a proper name, there would have been a natural interpretation of the VOS order.

=== Coeur d'Alene ===
Coeur d’Alene is a Salishan language that has VOS as its dominant word order but does use word order to distinguish subject nouns from object nouns or agent nouns from patient nouns.

Verb-transitive	Indirect object	Direct object	(Agent-)Subject
tšiɫts	xʷää ban	xʷaa mimš	xʷa 'aa djən
he gave it to him	the Ben	the box	by John
“John gave the box to Ben”

Verb-passive	Direct Object	Subject	Agent (non-subject)
itši᷄ɫtəm	xʷamimš	xʷä bän	xʷa ˀa djən
he is being given	the box	the Ben	by John
“Ben is being given the box by John”

=== European Portuguese ===
Portuguese is a Western Romance language spoken in many places around the globe: Portugal, Brazil, Macau, etc. The language is split into European Portuguese and Brazilian Portuguese. European Portuguese is said to have a very flexible word order, and one of its grammatical possibilities is VOS.

Comeu a sopa o Paul
ate-3SG the soup {} Paul
Verb {} Object {} Subject
Paul ate the soup

=== Halkomelem ===
Halkomelem, an aboriginal language in British Columbia, has the same basic characteristics the other Salish languages by being inherently VSO. However, VOS is also sometimes possible. While some speakers do not accept VOS as grammatical, others allow it depending on the context. VOS may occur if there are two direct noun phrases in a clause, and the object is inanimate. Also, VOS is used if the content of the phrase disambiguates the agent from the patient:

niʔ pən-ət-əs ɫə q́emiʔ kʷθə sqewθ
AUX plant-TR-3SUB DET girl DET potato
{} Verb {} Subject {} Object
The girl planted the potatoes

niʔ pən-ət-əs kʷθə sqewθ ɫə q́emiʔ
AUX plant-TR-3SUB DET potato DET girl
{} Verb {} Subject {} Object
The girl planted the potatoes

The sentences below indicate that the object in a VOS sentence in Halkomelem is interpreted in its base position (VSO) for the purposes of binding theory.

hélpex-es [te sthóq’i-s]ₒ [te Strang]s
eat-3S DET fish-3POSS DET Strang
Verb {} Object {} Subject
Strang is eating his fish

*hélpex-es [te sthóq’i-s tú-tl’òᵢ]ₒ [te Strangᵢ]s
eat-3S DET fish-3POSS DET-3INDEP DET Strang
Verb {} Object {} {} Subject
Strang is eating his fish

=== Italian (special case) ===
Italian is most commonly a SVO language, but inversion can occur. If the subject may appear before the verb, it may appear also after the verb. VSO and VOS order, however, are notably rare, especially the latter.

Esamineranno il caso molti esperti.
will.examine-3PL the case many experts
Verb {} Object {} Subject
Many experts will examine the case.

=== Kaqchikel ===
Kaqchikel is an ergative and head-marking Mayan language in Guatemala. There is no case marking on the subject or the object. Instead, the verb classifies the person and numeric (plural or singular) agreement of the subjects and objects. Kaqchikel's basic structure is VOS, but the language allows for other word orders such as SVO. Since the language is head-marking, a sentence focuses on the subject that is before the verb. A sentence may be either VOS or VSO if switching the subject and the object semantically changes the meaning, but VOS is more common. An example is shown in the table below:

Sentence	X-∅-u-chöy	ri	chäj / ajanel	ri	ajanel / chäj
Gloss	CP-ABS3sg-ERG3sg-cut	DET	pine.tree / carpenter	DET	carpenter / pine.tree
Parts	Verb		Object / Subject		Subject / Object
Translation	The carpenter cut the pine tree.				

=== Malagasy ===
Malagasy is an Austronesian language that is the national language of Madagascar. It is a classic example of a language that has a fixed VOS structure:

Sentence	Namonjy	azy	aho
Gloss	help.out	him	I
Parts	Verb	Object	Subject
Translation	I helped him out		

This sentence shows the consistency of VOS in Malagasy with transitive verbs:

Sentence	Manolotra	ny	vary	ny	vahiny	aho
Gloss	offer.AT	the	rice	the	guests	I
Parts	Verb		(Indirect) Object		(Direct) Object	Subject
Translation	'I offered the rice to the guests.'					

The extraction pattern in Malagasy, in which subjects can be relativized, but non-subjects within the VP lead to ungrammaticality, is consistent with a VP-raising hypothesis. This sentence shows the possibility of relativizing surface subjects:

Sentence	ny	zazavavy	[_{CP} izay	[_{VP} manasa	ny	lamba]	< ___ > ]
Gloss	the	girl	C	wash.AT	the	clothes	
Parts	Subject			Verb	Object		<Subject>
Translation	'the girl that washed the clothes ...'						

This sentence shows how extraction from within the VP is ungrammatical (*):

Sentence	*ny	lamba	[_{CP} izay	[_{VP} manasa	< ___ > ]	ny	zazavavy ]
Gloss	the	clothes	C	wash.AT		the	girl
Parts	Object			Verb	<Object>	Subject	
Translation	Intended: 'the clothes that the girl washed ...'						

The empty spaces (___) are the extraction sites and the square brackets indicate the VP phrase.

=== Mandarin (special cases) ===
Unlike English, which places head nouns before relative clauses, Mandarin places head nouns after relative clauses. As a result, subject-gapped relative clauses in Mandarin, just like in Cantonese, result in a VOS order.

==== Example of subject-gapped relative clauses in Mandarin ====
Sentence	親	公雞	的	老鼠
Romanization	qīn	gōng jī	de	lǎo shǔ
Gloss	kiss	chicken	relativizer	mouse
Parts	Verb	Object		Subject
Head Noun and RC Gap	Relative Clause			Head Noun
Translation	The mouse that kisses the chicken.			

It is considered extremely rare for a SVO language to adopt a prenominal RC structure. In a sample of 756 languages, only 5 languages have that VOS combination, less than 0.01%, one being Mandarin.

=== Modern Greek (special cases) ===
Greek has a relatively flexible word order. However, there is an ongoing discussion of how VOS is rendered. The table below shows an example of a VOS sentence in Modern Greek:

έφαγε την τούρτα ο Γιάννης
éfage tin toúrta o Giánnis
ate-3SG the cake-ACC the John-NOM
Verb {} Object {} Subject
John ate the cake.

Georgiafentis and Sfakianaki provide claims of four different researchers, who focus on how prosody affects the generated VOS in Greek:

Alexiadou suggests that the prominent constituent in VOS is the DP-subject. The DP-object moves over the DP-subject into a specifier position of VoiceP to derive the VOS order. The object movement to the specifier position is a result of scrambled objects and manner adverbs wanting to both move to VoiceP. Thus, the main stress is given to the DP-subject.

Philippakki-Warburton claims there are two intonation patterns that cause VOS in Greek:

1. The prominent constituent is something other than the DP-subject, like the verb or the DP-object. Therefore, the DP-subject is unstressed.
2. VOS is produced by p-movement (prosodic movement), from the DP-subject being emphatically stressed or from it being stressed because of Chomsky and Halle's Nuclear Stress Rule (NSR)

Haidou proposes that VOS has two possible intonations: whether a pause or not precedes the DP-subject will change the focus of the sentence. If there is a preceding pause (indicated with a comma intonation), the DP-subject does not possess the main focus. The focus is then instead on the object, as demonstrated in the table below.

έφαγε τη σούπα, ο Γιάννης
éfage ti soúpa, o Giánnis
ate-3SG the soup-ACC the Janis-NOM
Verb {} Object {} Subject
Ate the soup, John.

Georgiafentis argues that subject focusing in VOS is derived from three intonational situations:

1. The main stress is acquired by a constituent other than the DP-subject (same discussion as Philippaki-Warbuton)
2. The DP-subject acquires main stress through NSR
3. The DP-subject is contrastively focused

Here is an example of a Greek contrastively-focused DP-subject (capitalized words indicate a contrastive focus):

έφαγε την τούρτα ο Γιάννης (όχι ο Θανάσης)
éfage tin toúrta o Giánnis (óchi o Thanásis)
ate-3SG the cake-ACC the John-NOM (not the Thanasis-NOM)
Verb {} Object {} Subject {} {} {}
John ate the cake (not Thanasis).

Georgiafentis states that both the second and the third situation above are derived from p-movement.

=== Seediq ===
Seediq, an Atayalic language with a fixed VOS order, is spoken by Taiwanese indigenous people in northern Taiwan and the Taroko. Only the subject, which is always fixed in its clause-final position, may correspond to an argument with an absolutive case. No other clause-internal constituents may have an absolutive DP in Seediq.

Wada big-un hulama na Ape ka laqi
PAST give-TR treat ERG Ape ABS child
{} Verb {} {} Object {} Subject
Ape gave the child a treat

=== Twana ===
Twana, a Coast Salishan language, has VOS as its basic word order, which distinguishes subject noun phrases from object noun phrases in sentences with active transitive verbs. Twana avoids using VSO, at least according to the evidence that was provided by the last proficient speaker.

bikʷɪdkʷə᷄dad tibə᷄dəs təstibˀa᷄t
{he is grabbing} the-son-his the-man
V-transitive Object Subject
‘The man is grabbing his son’

=== Tzotzil ===
Tzotzil, like almost all other Mayan languages except Ch'orti', is a verb-initial word order language and is predominantly VOS but has been shown to permit SVO readily. In Tzotzil, the subject is not assumed to raise (in overt syntax) to the specifier of the clausal head, unlike Italian, which is a special case. A sample Tzotzil sentence is in the table below. The "ʔ" represent a glottal stop.

ʔi- s- pet lok'el ʔantz ti t'ul -e
cp A3 carry away woman the rabbit cl
{} {} Verb {} Object {} Subject {}
The rabbit carried away the woman

VP-raising, as expressed in the previous section, cannot account for Tzotzil's normal word order. If VP-raising had occurred, any further movement of direct objects or prepositional phrases would have been made prevented. Aissen, however, showed that Tzotzil allows direct objects to be extracted since wh-movement occurs:

Buch'u s- pas mantal ___?
who? A3- do order {}
Subjects {} Verb Objects {}
Who's giving the orders?

Tzotzil also allows propositional phrases before the subject and all of those in verb phrases to undergo wh-movement. Also, an interrogative phrase of a transitive verb must entirely be pied-piped to be grammatical.

[Buch'u ta s- na] av- ik'ta komel l- -a- -bolsa -e ___?
who? P A3- house A2- leave Dir the- -A2- -bag- -cl {}
Subject {} {} {} {} Verb {} {} {} Object {} {}
In whose house did you leave your bag?

*Buch'u av- ik'ta komel a- -bolsa [ta s- na ___?]
who? A2- leave Dir A2- bag P A3- house {}
Subject {} Verb {} {} Object {} {} {} {}
Whose house did you leave your bag? at

VOS clauses in Tzotzil cannot thus be derived by VP-raising. Chung proposes that languages without VP-raising may be assumed to have VOS, instead of SVO, as their basic word order.

== Generative analysis ==
=== VP-raising ===
There is ongoing debate in generative linguistics as to how VOS clauses are derived, but there is significant evidence for verb-phrase-raising. Kayne's theory of antisymmetry suggests that VOS clauses are derived from SVO structure via the leftward movement of a VP constituent that contains a verb and object. The principles and parameters theory sets VOS and SVO clause structures as syntactically identical but does not account for SVO being typologically more common than VOS. According to the principles and parameters theory, the difference between SVO and VOS clauses is the direction in which parameters are set for projection of a T category's specifier. When the parameter is to the right of T(ense)'s specifier, VOS is realized, and when it is to the left, SVO is realized.

The motivation for movement from SVO to VOS structure is still undetermined, as some languages show inconsistencies with SVO underlying structure and an absence of VP-raising (such as Chamorro and Tzotzil). In verb-initial languages, the extended projection principle causes overt specifier movement from the strong tense [T], verb [V], or predicate [Pred] features.

Chung proposes a syntactic profile for verb-initial languages that are derived through VP-raising:

1. VP coordination is allowed.
2. The subject and other constituents outside the verb phrase can be extracted.
3. The subject has narrow scope over sentential elements.

VOS can be derived from SVO, but Maria Polinsky suggests that verb-initial languages (V1 languages) display other properties that correlate with verb-initiality and are crucial to analysis of V1 order.

==== Subject-only restriction ====
The subject-only restriction (SOR) exists in most, if not all, Austronesian languages and follows from the VP-raising account of VOS.

In a given clause, only one argument such as the external arguments, the subjects, or the sentence's most prominent argument, is attainable for "extraction" to undergo movements, which includes A-bar movements like wh-movement, topicalization, and relativization. No other arguments, such as the internal arguments or VP adjuncts, may undergo such movement. Since SOR restricts any internal arguments and VP adjuncts from undergoing any movements, the VP-internal or low adjuncts are not qualified to behave as if they are stranded by VP-raising. As a result, VOS is retained in those languages.

Examples in Seediq:

VP-external constituents are the only accessible constituents when structures require movements (like relative clauses or topicalization). In other words, structures requiring movements may access constituents only if they are external to VP. Any movement regarding the VP-internal or adjuncts constituents fails to satisfy the subject-only restriction.

Sentence	M-n-ari	inu	patis	Ape
Gloss	buy	where	book	Ape
Parts	V		O	S
Translation	Where did Ape buy books?			

Sentence	*Inu	m-n-ari	patis	Ape
Gloss	where	buy	book	Ape
Parts		V	O	S
Translation	*Where did Ape buy books?			

Since movements with respect to internal arguments and VP adjuncts are not allowed in Seediq, and only VP-external movement is possible (unless the predicate undergo a change in voice morphology), only VOS is grammatical.

=== VP-remnant raising ===
==== Remnant raising and clause-final adjuncts ====
VP-raising accounts for Toba Batak are proposed by Cole and Herman. However, prior to the VP moving to its final position, they argue that adverbs and prepositions move out of the VP. If there are adjuncts present, VP-raising is considered as a type of remnant movement.

In contrast to Cole and Herman's prediction, Massam's proposal states that indirect objects and obliques that are generated higher than the VP have grammatical subextraction unless they move from the VP.

==== Remnant raising and VSO ====
If the object evacuates the VP before the VP moves into a higher position within the clause, it derives VSO order instead, of VOS. Massam looks at the difference between VP-raising accounts of VOS and VSO by investigating the Niuean language. Massam argues that whether a NP object or a DP is selected by the verb determines if there is VP or VP-remnant raising. To get the structure of a VOS clause, an NP object is selected by the verb; the selected NP does not need case and so it will stay in the VP. Consequently, the object is pseudo-incorporated into the verb in the VOS clause. If a DP object is selected by the verb, VP-remnant movement occurs and creates VSO.

Both possibilities are shown in the tables below:

===== Niuean VSO =====
Sentence	Kua	kai	e	mautolu	e	ika	mo	e	talo	he	mogonei
Gloss	PERF	eat	ERG	1PL.EX	ABS	fish	COMPTV	ABS	taro	LOC	now
Parts		Verb		Subject		Object					
Translation	We are eating fish and taro right now.										

===== Niuean VOS =====
Sentence	Kua	kai	ika	mo	e	talo	a	mautolu	he	mogonei
Gloss	PERF	eat	fish	COMOPTV	ABS	taro	ABS	1PL.EX	LOC	now
Parts		Verb	Object					Subject		
Translation	We are eating fish and taro right now.									

==== VP-raising and VSO/VOS alternations ====
For languages whose alternations between VOS and VSO are more difficult to characterize, other factors help distinguish the word order. Unlike Niuean, whose objects are case-marked in VSO, not in VOS, Kroeger proposes that factors such as thematic role and grammatical functions help characterize word order such as in Tagalog. In reference to the verb, the argument with the highest thematic role should be the closest to it, and the highest grammatical function should be the farthest. For specifically-active voice clauses, the competition between the two situations helps to explain the variation of word order in Tagalog. Since there is no conflict in non-active clauses, there is less variation in word order.

=== Flexible linearization (FL) approach ===
Bury proposed that any phrase containing a subject and a constituent with a verb and an object can be linearized with the subject to the left or to the right of the verb-object constituent. That is called the flexible linearization (FL) approach, and with the combination of verb movement, it can account for most, if not all, VOS and VSO derivations. Under the assumption, word orders in languages surface as VOS because they may have been linearized with the subject, in this case to the right of the verb-object constituent.

FL approach differs from most other analyses such as by not assuming whether VOS or VSO has a more basic and rigid structure in the language and that the other one is derived from a special rule. FL approach emphasizes less on syntax and word orders and assumes that both VOS and VSO can occur underlyingly in different languages. Thus, alternation between VOS and VSO is expected in verb-initial languages unless the position of the subject or the object has some grammatical role:

Structure (not linearized): [ H [S [V O]] ] (where H stands for a head) can be pronounced as H + V S O conventionally.

Under the FL approach however, that structure can be pronounced as H + V O S, as the phrase is said to be linearized with the subject to the right of the verb-object constituent. Consequently, we see a VOS order.

Both pronunciations are linearizations of the same structure, but unless there are independent constraints on word order in a given language, both VSO and VOS orders are attainable in the same language.

=== Scrambling VSO ===
Scrambling in languages after VSO allows the derivation of VOS. A primary example is from Tongan:

Tongan VSO

Sentence	Na’e	tamate’i	‘e	Tēvita	‘a	Kōlaiate.
Gloss	PST	kill.TR	ERG	David	ABS	Goliath
Parts	V-transitive		Subject		Object	
Translation	"David killed Goliath."					

Tongan VOS

Sentence	Na'e	tamate’i	'a	Kōlaiate	‘e	Tēvita
Gloss	PST	kill.TR	ABS	Goliath	ERG	David
Parts	V-transitive		Object		Subject	
Translation	‘David killed Goliath.’					

Both sentences above in translation share the same meaning. However, the possibility of scrambling allows Tongan to scramble from its initial VSO state to a VOS form.

=== Right-branching ===
Right-branching occurs if the initial language has a subject that acts as a right-branching specifier. That means that the specifier becomes the sister of the V' located to the right. One of the forms of right-branching in VOS is parameterized right-branching, which moves the subject out of the right-branching VP domain and into a left-branching position. That is found in Tz'utujil in which right-branching occurs when the specifier begins with a lexical category, but left-branching occurs when the specifier begins with a functional category. These two tables below these examples:

X-∅-kee-tij tzyaq ch’ooyaa’.
COM-3SG.ABS-3PL.ERG-eat clothes rats
Verb Object Subject
Rats ate the clothes

In that sentence, the normal word order is VOS. In a tree however, "rats," would appear as the sister to the V'. The V' would then branch out into the VP (eat) and the object (clothes). That is what would be referred to as right+branching.

Ja ch’ooyaa’. X-∅-kee-tij tzyaq
DEF rats COM-3SG.ABS-3PL.ERG-eat clothes
{} Subject Verb Object
The rats ate clothes

In that sentence, word order changes from VOS to SVO from left-branching to right-branching. As previously mentioned, one of the rules of Tz'utujil is if the specifier begins with a functional category, it is left branched. That means that the specifier will be placed as the sister to the left of V', and V' will branch as normally.

=== p-movement ===
Zubizarreta (1998) proposes p-movement as an analysis of certain movement operations in Spanish. Firstly, the VOS order is not a basic order but is instead derived from VSO or SVO by preposing the object. VOS order is allowed only in contexts that indicate that the subject is focused. That movement is triggered when the subject needs to be focused and so it is not a feature driven movement but instead a prosodically-motivated movement, hence the name p-movement.

p-movement is also a strictly-local process. Zubizaretta claims that the stress on the subject is neutral. It is the Nuclear Stress Rule (NSR), rather than her proposed additional focal stress rule, that assigns stress to the subject in VOS structures. The NSR allows for focus projection and so it is expected that wide focal interpretations are available in VOS, just like in VSO and in SVO.

Thus, it can be understood that fronting the object is motivated by allowing the subject to be at the place that nuclear stress falls.

== See also ==
- Subject–object–verb
- Subject–verb–object
- Object–subject–verb
- Object–verb–subject
- Verb–subject–object
