= Batak Toba =

Toba Batak may refer to:

- Toba Batak people, of North Sumatra, Indonesia
- Toba Batak language
