= AUQ =

AUQ or auq may refer to:

- AUQ, the IATA code for Atuona Airport, Hiva Oa, Marquesas Islands, French Polynesia
- auq, the ISO 639-3 code for Anus language, Papua, Indonesia
