= Bonggo =

Bonggo may be,

- Bonggo language
- Park Bonggo, runner
- Bonggo, a district in Sarmi Regency, Papua, Indonesia
