= Sarmi–Jayapura languages =

Languages

Sarmi–Jayapura
- Sarmi–Jayapura Bay
- Geographic distribution: Northern Papua
- Linguistic classification: Austronesian: Malayo-Polynesian; Oceanic; Western Oceanic; North New Guinea ?; Sarmi–Jayapura
- Proto-language: Proto-Sarmi–Jayapura

Language codes
- Glottolog: sarm1241

The Sarmi–Jayapura languages consist of half a dozen languages spoken on the northern coast of Papua province of Indonesia:

Sobei, Bonggo, Tarpia (Sarmi), Kayupulau, Ormu, Tobati–Enggros (Jayapura Bay).

Ross (1988) had considered Sarmi and Jayapura Bay (Kayapulau, Orma and Tobati) to be separate but related groups. Ross (1988) listed several additional Sarmi languages:

Anus (Korur) and Podena, Liki, and Wakde (close to Sobei), Masimasi, Kaptiau and Yamna.

The inclusion of a supposed Yarsun language appears to be due to confusion of language names with island names. No such language is attested; the island is located between that of the Anus and Podena languages, and all three islands are reported to speak dialects of a single language according to the first source to mention it.

With the exception of certain Micronesian languages, the Sarmi–Jayapura languages have the westernmost distribution out of all Oceanic languages.

== Sound correspondences ==
Grace (1971:34–37) published a table of sound correspondences for the Sarmi languages, from which the following forms are gleaned. The languages are arranged from west to east.

Proto-Oceanic	Sobei	Wakde	Masimasi	Anus	Bonggo	Tarpia
*api 'fire'	yafu	yafu		yeif	af	yap
*isuŋ 'nose'	su-	hiu-	si-	su-	sua-	siwi-
*susu 'breast'	sisu-	ihi-			su-	su-
*ranum 'water'	rani	ranu	ranu	dein	dan	dan
*raun 'leaf'	rau	rau	rou	dau	dau	dau
*mapine 'woman'	mefne	mafani		mofin	mofin	mupin
*manuk 'bird'	maninetio	mani	mani	mein	man	man
*pulu 'feather'	fido	firu		firo	fru	puru
*puaq 'fruit'	afo	afu	afo	fowo	fukwa	pawa
*paqoRu 'new'	fefou	afafu		fofou	fieu	pipiu
*patu 'stone'	fati	fati	fati	feit	fiat	payaʔ
*pat 'four'	fau	fau		fau	fau	pau
*tolu 'three'	tou	tou	tour	tou	tor	tor
*taliŋa 'ear'	tidi-	tiri-	tira-	terne-	təren-	tarni-
*taŋis 'cry'	-tan	-tan	-tan	-tein	tənian	-nsin
*taumataq 'person'	temto	tamturi		timot	tumuat	tamuʔ
*kutu 'louse'	kute	witi		kut	kut	kuʔ
*kulit 'skin'	wadi	wari	wiri	keri	kru	kuru
*qone 'sand'	wane	wane	wane	wen	wen	wen
*qasawa 'spouse'	eson	ahun		sawe	sua	tawa
