= Liki language =

Austronesian language of Indonesia

Liki
- Moar
- Native to: Indonesia
- Region: Papua
- Ethnicity: (undated figure of 320)
- Native speakers: 11 (2005)
- Language family: Austronesian: Malayo-Polynesian; Oceanic; Western Oceanic; North New Guinea; Sarmi – Jayapura Bay; Sarmi; Liki

Language codes
- ISO 639-3: lio
- Glottolog: liki1241
- ELP: Liki

Liki, also known as Moar, is a nearly extinct Austronesian language spoken on offshore islands of Papua province, Indonesia.

== See also ==
- Sarmi languages for a comparison with related languages
