= Kayu Pulau people =

Kayu Pulau–Kayu Batu
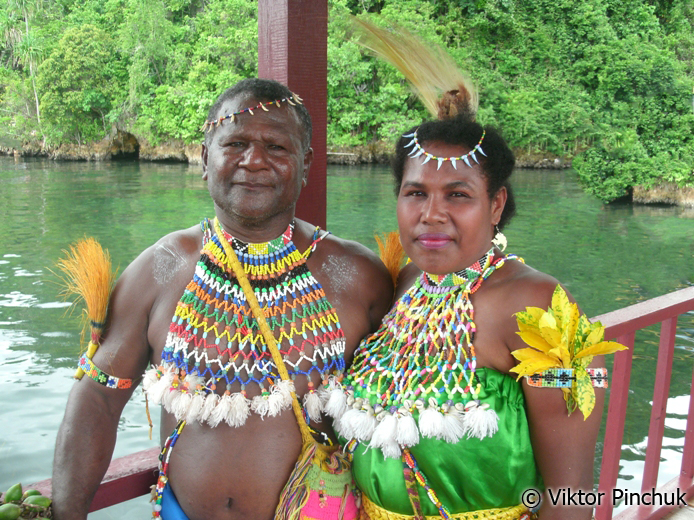
- A newly married couple wore traditional attire

Total population
- 700–800 (Kayo Pulau); 830 (Kayo Batu)

Regions with significant populations
- Papua (Jayapura)

Languages
- Kayu Pulau, Papuan Malay, and Indonesian

Religion
- Christianity

Related ethnic groups
- Tobati, Enggros, Ormu

Kayu Pulau (also known as Kayu Pulo or Kayo Pulau) is an ethnic group residing in Tahima Soroma (Kayu Pulo and Pulo Kosong), Jayapura, Papua, Indonesia. Meanwhile, people who are culturally and linguistically similar live in Kayo Batu are also called Kayu Batu (also known as Kayo Batu). They speak the same language, the Kayu Pulau–Kayu Batu language. In 2007, only 50 Kayu Pulau people were still able to speak this language.

== Traditional leader ==
=== Kayu Pulau ===
The Kayu Pulau people are led by the Main Ondoafi (Note: Ondoafi is a traditional village chief in Sentani region.), a position previously held by the late Gaspar Sibi. Meanwhile, the Youwe tribe also has its own keondoafian (traditional leadership), led by Nicolas Youwe (grandson of Nicolaas Jouwe). The village head of Tahima is Tomi Sibi, who oversees four sub-tribes (clans), along with their mata rumah (clan heads) as of 2020.

- The Sibi clan, led by Frans Sibi.
- The Haay clan. The clan symbol is the bamboo shark (locally known as gurango) with a cross, and there is a taboo against eating bamboo sharks or white crabs. Led by Fredik Haay.
- The Sorro (or Soro) clan, led by Hengky Sorro.
- The Youwe clan, whose clan symbol is a sea turtle and has a taboo of eating lobster. Led by Silas Youwe.

=== Kayu Batu ===
The Kayu Batu has only two clans: Makanuay and Puy. Over time, these clans further divided into Makanuay I (called Rei in the local language), Makanuay II (Remta), and Puy (C’thargu). The Ondoafi comes from the Makanuay I clan and oversees the chiefs of the Makanuay II and Puy clans. In 2023, the ondoafi position was held by Ridolof Ray L. Makanuay. The other two clans are led by:

- Puy clan, led by Nikolaus Puy
- Makanuay II clan, led by Julius Makanuay

== History ==
The Kayu Pulau people have lived in Tahima Soroma for hundreds of years. The villages comprised the Sibi Rumah Cone, Sibi Rahabeam, Haay, and Sorro clans. Meanwhile, the Youwe (Jouwe) clan, originating from the Cycloop Mountains, came and settled in Pulo Kosong. The Youwe clan's presence in Kayu Pulau stemmed from their house (Karware) being burned by another tribe. This destruction forced the Youwe clan to flee to Kayu Pulau.

Upon the arrival of the Jouwe clan, the Kayu Pulau people held a meeting in para-para (Note: Para-para is a traditional house in Sentani where it functions as a place for meeting.). During a meeting, they accepted the Jouwe clan into Kayu Pulau and granted them territories. The Sibi clan occupies the western end, while the Haay clan is in the eastern end. The Youwe clan, consisting of two brothers, received the central area and was tasked with managing the village and serving as guardians of the sea, while the Sorro clan served as messengers. During the Second World War, all village residents were evacuated to Ormu. By 1946, when the war ended, the villagers returned to Kayu Pulau and have inhabited the island again ever since.

== Culture ==
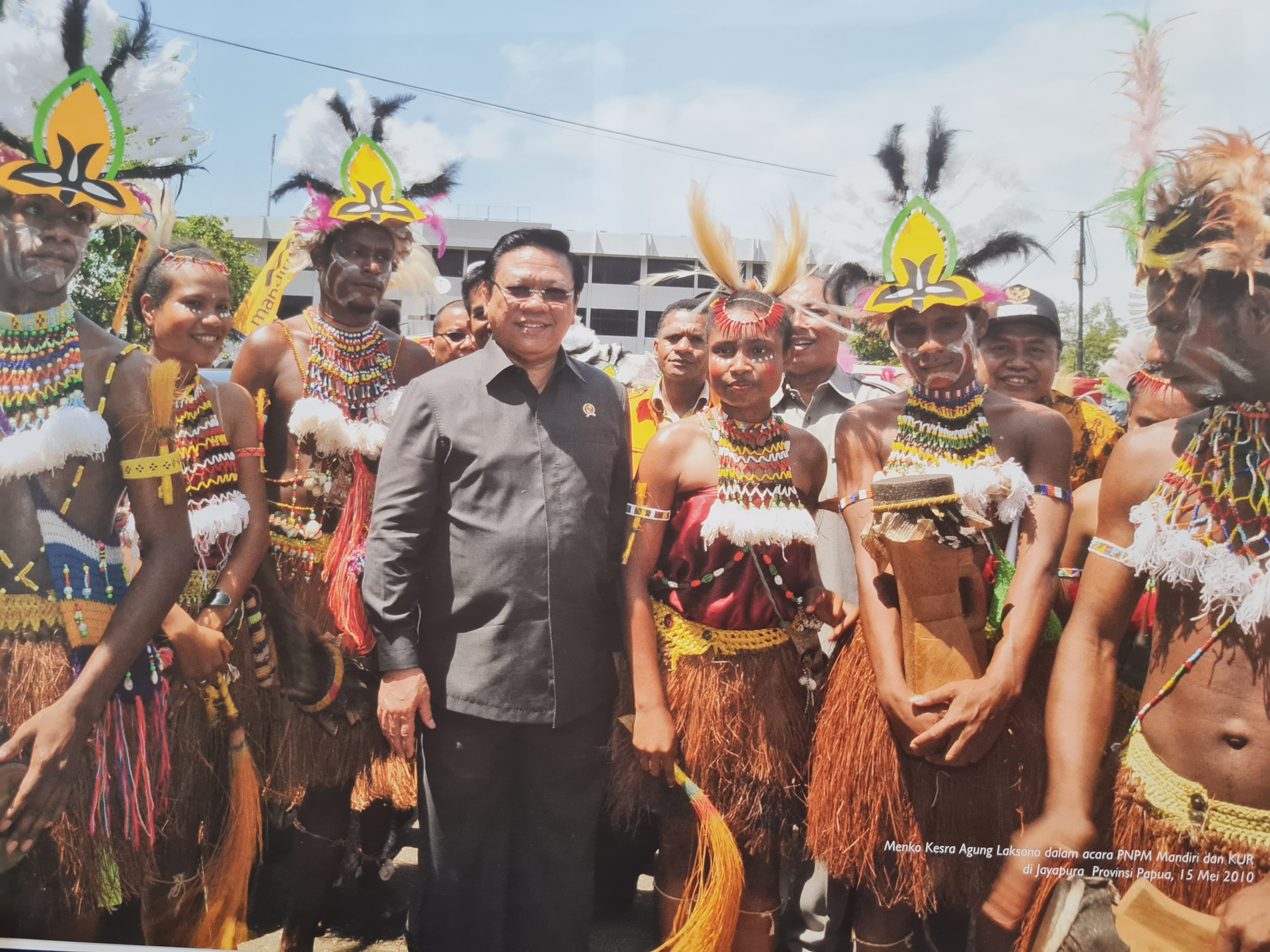
Coordinating Minister for People's Welfare, Agung Laksono, with the Kayu Pulau/Kayu Batu people in Jayapura, 2010.

=== Beads ===
Beads are valuable items used as jewelry ornaments and as payments in customary sanctions. The colors of the beads are as follows:

- Sea blue or Stra
- Milky blue or Sboni
- Green or Sawo
- White or Nento
- Yellow or Hasyre

== Notable people ==
- Nicolaas Jouwe, Papuan politician who served as the vice-chair of New Guinea Council (1961–1963).
