= Tobati people =

Ethnic group in Indonesia

Tobati Tobati–Enggros Youtefa Tobati
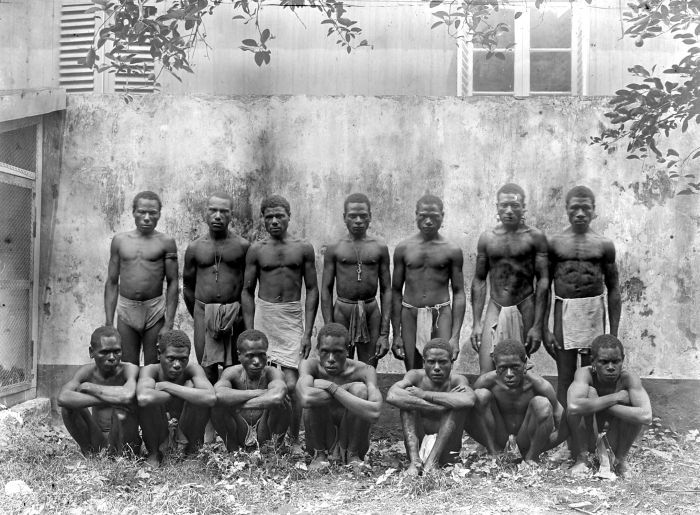
- Tobati men in Ternate, 1903.

Total population
- 100

Regions with significant populations
- Papua (Jayapura)

Languages
- Tobati, Papuan Malay, and Indonesian

Religion
- Majority:Christianity (80%), Minority:Islam (15-20%)

Related ethnic groups
- Enggros • Nafri • Sentani

The Tobati people (also known as Tobati–Enggros; also referred to as Youtefa Tobati) are an ethnic group from Jayapura, Indonesia. The Tobati people inhabit the coastal area of Youtefa Bay, covering an area of 1,675 hectares within the South Jayapura district, and they have constructed settlements above the sea.

== Etymology ==
The name Tobati has the same origin as Tabi, which means 'sunrise'. This village is believed to have been founded by the 'siblings of the sun', hence named Tabati, which later became Tobati. According to another source, the name Tobati comes from to, meaning 'sultan's command', and bati, means 'boundary', indicating the Sultan of Tidore boundary reached Tobati Island.

== History ==
The Tobati people are the original inhabitants of Jayapura. They are also known as the Tobati–Enggros people. However, the Enggros is occasionally considered a separate ethnic group but still closely related to Tobati. Apart from the Tobati tribe, there are also other indigenous tribes in Jayapura City, such as the Kayu Pulau, Kayu Batu, Nafri, Skouw, and Sentani tribes.

Not far from the center of Jayapura city, about 20 minutes towards Abepura district, there is a bay called Youtefa Bay. In the bay, there are two traditional villages of the Tobati people, Tobati and Enggros, which have long inhabited the area.

== Customs ==
=== Leadership system ===
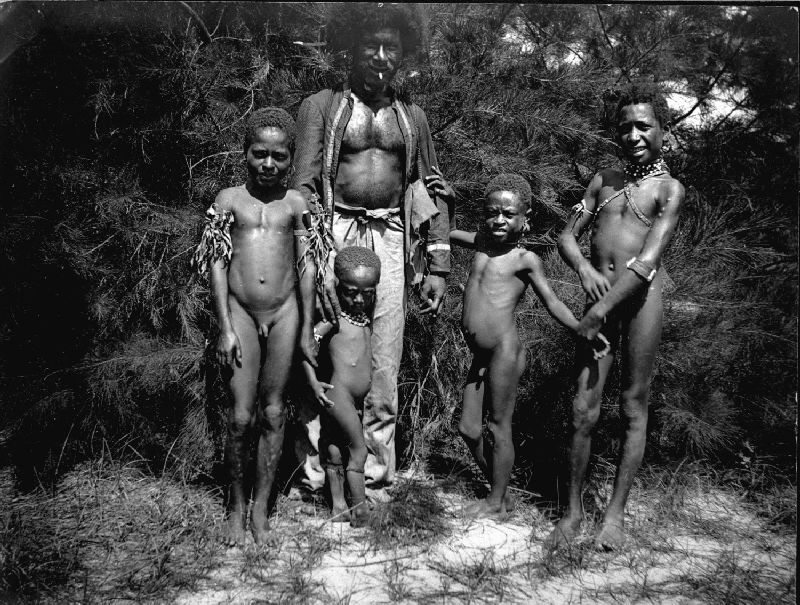
the Ondoafi (korano, chief) of Tobati and his family, 1903

The Tobati, like other ethnic groups in Youtefa Bay, has a traditional political leadership system led by an ondoafi (village leader or chief), and the position has been inherited through generations. When the evangelist named Bilt began serving in the Tobati area, Tobati was led by a tribal chief named Jantewai. When Jantewai died, his son Hamadi was appointed as the ondoafi. To this day, the Hamadi clan still holds the position of ondoafi of the Tobati tribe that leads several other tribal chiefs/clans such as Itaar, Afaar, Hanasbey, Mano, Ireeuw, Hasor, Merauje, Merahabia, Caay, Hanoeby, and Dawir.

=== Marriage ===
During the marriage procession, the Tobati people must undergo seven customary processes before officially becoming a family. The first process begins with the groom's side, which is the proposal process. The groom's family will go to the bride's house to seek permission to propose to the bride. After that, in the second process, the bride's side will reciprocate the visit by sending food to the groom's house. The third process is where the groom's side will gather a certain amount of dowry as agreed upon. In the fourth process, still from the groom's side, the dowry will be directly delivered to the bride's side. Then, in the fifth process, both sides are ready to conduct the holy wedding blessing in the church and simultaneously register the marriage at the Civil Registry Office. After that, the sixth process is where the bride will be escorted to the groom's house. The last process is to deliver various kitchen utensils from the bride's side to the groom's house. All processes have been completed and will be concluded by signing the dowry acceptance agreement from the groom's side to the bride's side, which will end with a feast or meal together.

== Architecture ==
=== Sway ===
Tobatis' daily dwelling place is called a sway house. The sway house is almost similar to the traditional kariwari house, with differences in the allocation or function of its rooms. This is done as a development of the traditional house form so that the traditional house and the living house can be distinguished while still remaining a characteristic building of the Tobati tribe. The allocation of each room in the sway house consists of a living room, bedroom, and dining room.

The layout of sway house buildings is constructed on the edge or at the side of the main village road, and the orientation of the buildings is directed towards the main road so that the houses face each other. In more detail, the layout of rooms within the sway consists of bedrooms, a living room, a kitchen area (often referred to as the working area for women), and a back terrace.

As for the interior of the house, the rooms are divided based on gender. The area for men is positioned towards the sea, while the area for women is inclined towards the land.

=== Kariwari ===
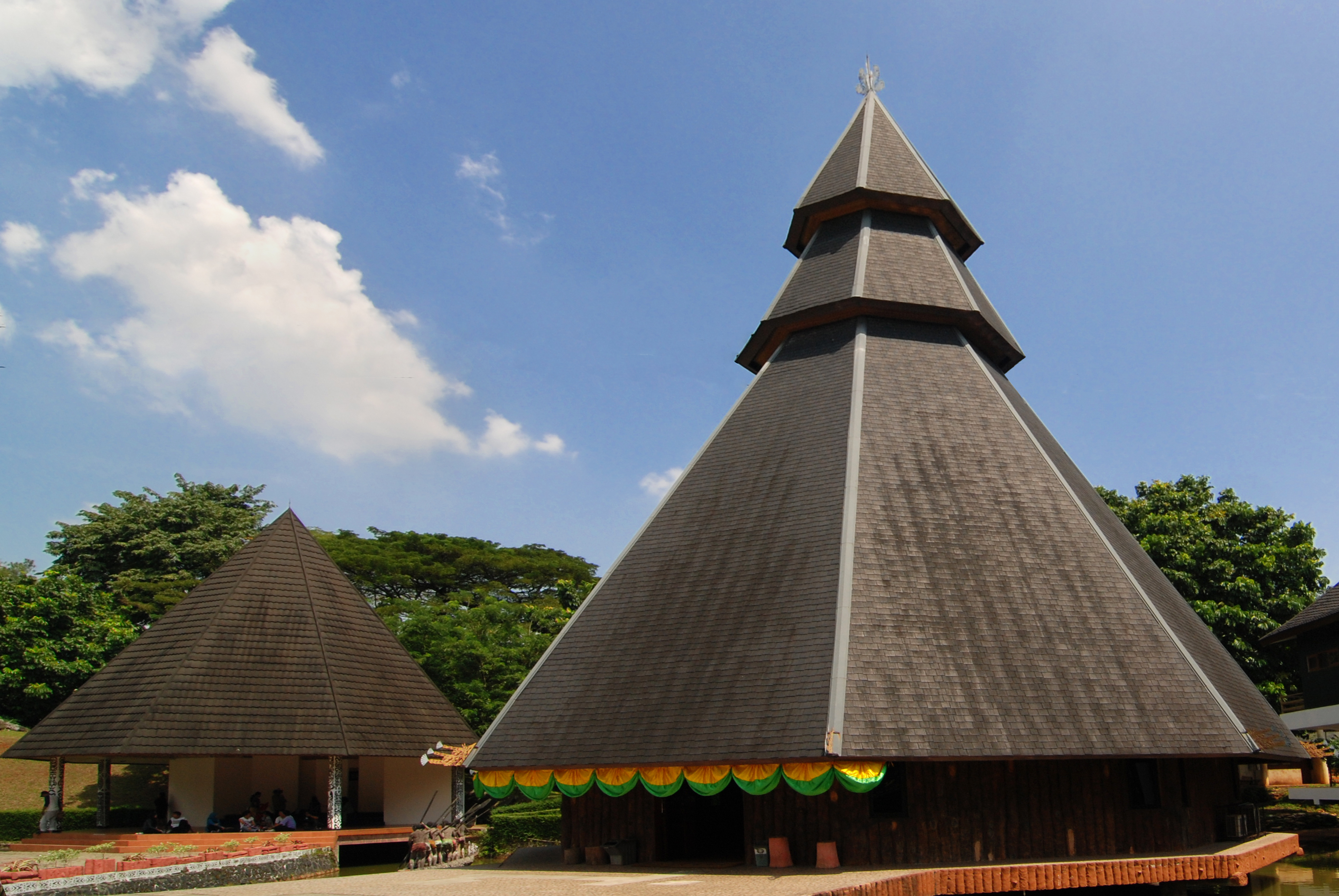
Kariwari in Taman Mini Indonesia Indah

The traditional house of the Tobati is called kariwari or mau house. This traditional house, which is 20–30 meters high, is for males aged 12 and above. It serves as a place for traditional ceremonies and also educates young boys on how to earn a living and survive by learning skills such as carving, weapon-making, boatbuilding, and warfare techniques.

The shape of this building itself is square or octagonal, resembling a cone, with its division consisting of three main floors: the foot part (floor 1), the body part (floor 2), and the head part (floor 3). The first floor is used as a place to educate young boys. The second floor is the tribal chief's room, meeting room, and resting place for males. Meanwhile, the third floor is used as a prayer area.

The octagonal shape of this building is constructed so that it can withstand strong wind. According to Tobati tradition, the conical roof allows them to be closer to their ancestors. The floor is made of layers of wood bark, while the building walls are made of bamboo tree shards, and the roof is made from sago leaves.

=== Keramba ===
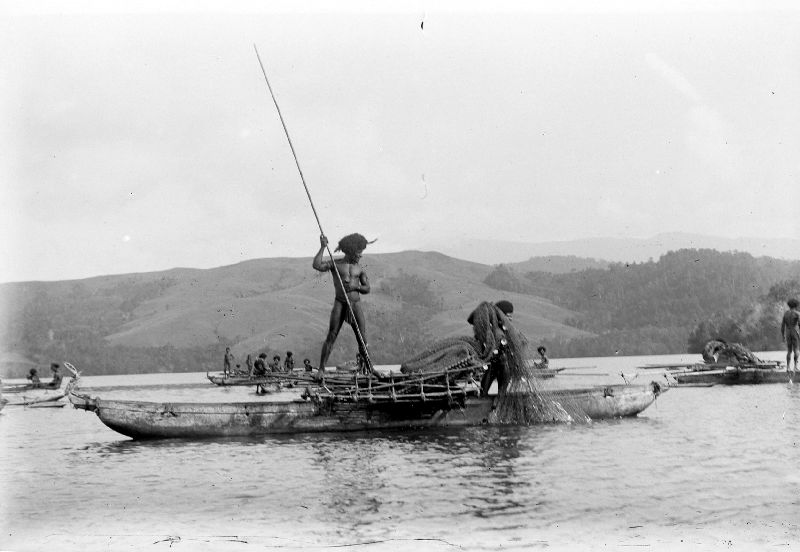
Tobati people fishing from a boat in 1903

The settlement of the Tobati tribe is located directly in coastal or marine areas. Therefore, fishing is one of their main activities, especially for men. Building kelong (floating fish pens) is a mandatory activity for them. The characteristic feature of the Tobati's kelong is that it is made from bamboo poles. These kelongs are usually placed beneath the houses, with nets surrounding each house pole.

Giant trevally and rabbitfish are two fishes most commonly cultivated by the Tobati people. In addition to catching fish, kelongs are also used to hold various small fish to attract larger fish into the nets set up around the bottom of the house.

== Religion ==
Before the introduction of Christianity and Islam in Jayapura, the Tobati tribe still adhered to animism or belief in ancestors. The evidence of this can be seen in the Kariwari house buildings. The conical or pyramid-shaped roof is interpreted by the Tobati as a form of respect for their ancestors and to bring them closer to God. At that time, The Tobati people also communicated with the Sultanate of Tidore, which later spread Islam through Muhammad Asghar, a scholar from Baghdad sent by the Ottoman Empire. Because of this, there are many historical remnants of Islam, such as mosques, some of which have been turned into museums in South Jayapura. Hamadi clan is believed to be patrilineal descendant of a Jailolo prince who was exiled and married local chief's daughter. The name Hamadi is a corruption of the prince's name Ahmadi.

Since the arrival of European missionaries, especially the Dutch, in 1910, Christianity has had a greater influence on the Tobati people's beliefs than the influence of the Sultanate of Tidore. The Gospel was spread in Papua, including the Tobati and Enggros villages, and the teachings of Christianity were subsequently accepted by the surrounding communities. Eventually, the Tobati people adhered to Christianity. Since the arrival of the Dutch, the mau houses were considered idols and inconsistent with Christian teachings, so the mau houses were destroyed, leaving poles the only remnants that can still be seen today.

== Transportation system ==
The Tobati people is a community inhabiting coastal areas, hence their main mode of transportation is boats. The local inhabitants call it wah, which means 'boat'. The people in Tobati village and Enggros village use wah as a means of 'public transportation' and also 'for fishing'. Initially, rowing was used to operate the wah, but nowadays, automatic engines have been used at wah to facilitate travel. Previously, traveling to a certain place took about 30 minutes, but now, with engines, the journey only takes around 4 minutes.

== Gallery ==
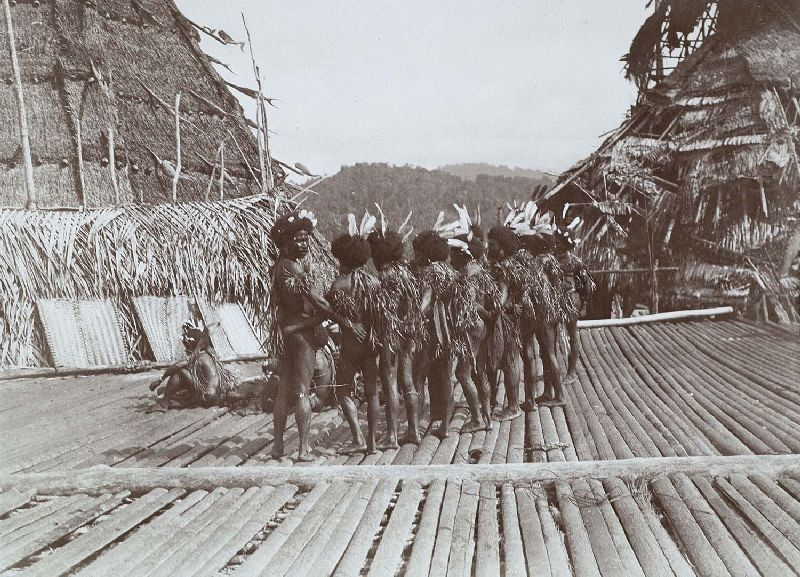
Tobati's Dancers in front of the men's house

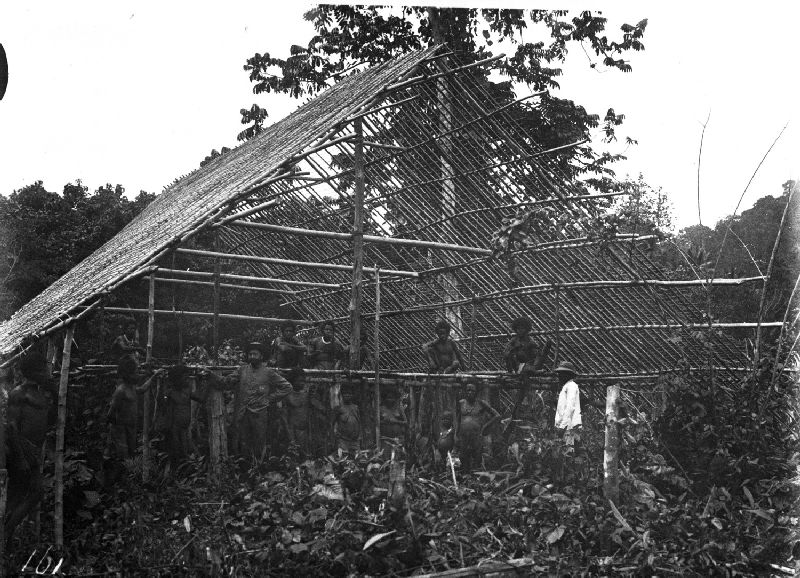
The construction of Kariwari

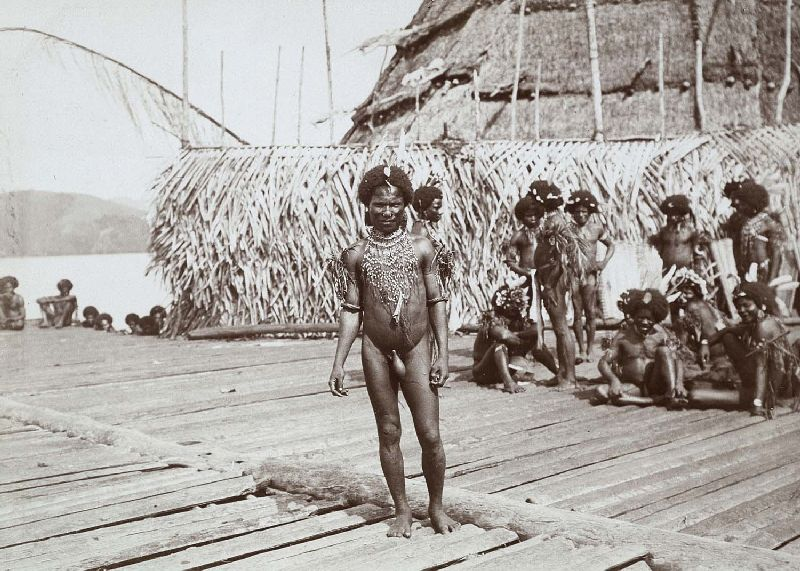
A Tobati dancer

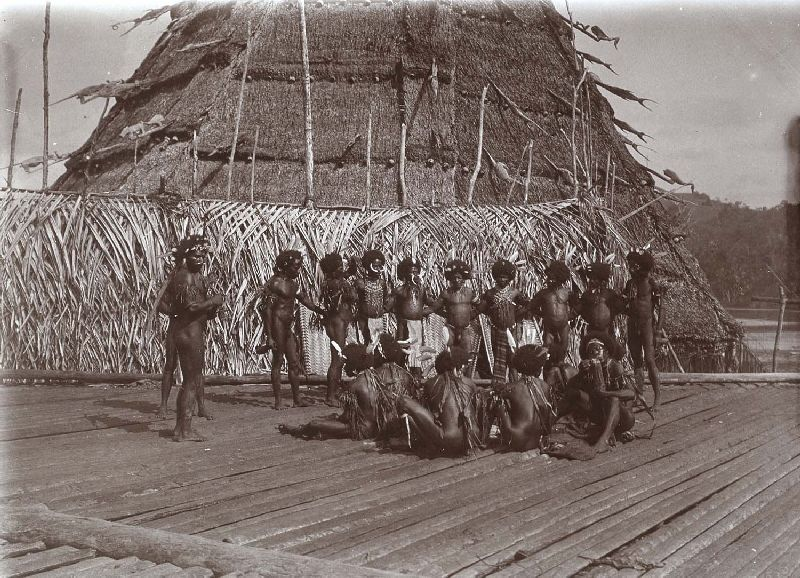
Dance party
