= Sobei language =

Sarmi language

Sobei
- Sobey
- Native to: Indonesia
- Region: Papua
- Ethnicity: 1,850 Sobei people (2000)
- Native speakers: 1,000 (2007)
- Language family: Austronesian: Malayo-Polynesian; Oceanic; Western Oceanic; North New Guinea; Sarmi – Jayapura Bay; Sarmi; Sobei

Language codes
- ISO 639-3: sob
- Glottolog: sobe1238
- ELP: Sobei

Sobei (Sobey) is one of the Sarmi languages spoken in three villages (Sarmi Kota, Sawar, and Bagaiserwar) near the district center of Sarmi in Papua province of Indonesia. Ethnologue (2005) cites two third-party population estimates of 1,000 and 1,850, while Sterner estimates the population at 1,500 (1975) and 2,000 (1987), based on actual residence in the area.

== Phonology ==
Sobei reflexes of some common Austronesian etyma include ima 'hand', betwe 'star', daidu 'two', faso 'paddle', fau 'four', mam 'father', nen 'mother', natu '(his/her) child', niwe 'coconut', pana 'food', puwe 'betelnut', rani 'water', rau 'leaf', -sa 'up', -si 'down', siso 'breast', tafi 'sugarcane', tano 'rain', temto 'man', tesese 'one', tou 'three', wane 'sand', yafu 'fire'.

=== Vowels ===
	Front	Central	Back
High	i		u
Mid	ɛ		o
Low		a	

=== Consonants ===
		Labial	Dental	Palatal	Velar	Glottal
Nasal		m	n			
Plosive	voiceless	p	t	c	k	ʔ
Plosive	voiced	b	d		g	
Fricative		f	s			
Liquid			r			
Semivowel		w		j		

== Morphology ==
=== Nouns ===
Sobei distinguishes alienable possession from inalienable possession by directly suffixing nouns in the latter type of relationship, principally body parts and kin terms. The morphophonemics are often complex: natu’ 'my child', natun 'his/her child', netrirse 'our child(ren)', netrise 'their child(ren)'; dabu'sa'a 'my head', dabusa'a 'his/her head', debrirsa'a 'our heads', debrisa'a 'their heads'. The following paradigm of the inalienably possessed noun tema- 'father' is from Sterner (1976). The intermediate -ri- before the possessive suffix serves as a plural marker. As an independent pronoun, ri is 3rd person plural ('they'). Some kin terms that do not take the possessive suffixes nevertheless have plural forms ending in -(r)i: wawa-ri 'uncle-PL', tinan-i 'mother-PL', nabai-yi 'cousin-PL'.

Person		Singular	Plural
1st person	exclusive	tema-'	tema-ri-mse
1st person	inclusive	—N/a	tema-ri-rse
2nd person		tema-m	tema-ri-mse
3rd person		tema-n	tema-ri-se

=== Independent pronouns ===
Person		Singular	Plural
1st person	exclusive	ya	mim
1st person	inclusive	—N/a	rer
2nd person		u	yam
3rd person		e	ri

=== Verbs ===
Sobei verb stems can include a number of aspectual, reciprocal, modificational, or directional affixes, but every verb is minimally prefixed to show the grammatical person and number of its subject and grammatical mood (realis or irrealis). Mood markers differ according to whether the stem is simple or complex, and some classes of verbs show stem allomorphy in their conjugational paradigms.

'come'
Person/Number	Realis	Irrealis
1SG	yomi	ima
2SG	umi	ama
3SG	ema	ama
1PL.INCL	timi	tama
1PL.EXCL	mimi	'a'ma
2PL	mimi	'a'ma
3PL	rimi	riama

'make'
Person/Number	Realis	Irrealis
1SG	yofi	yafei
2SG	ufi	afei
3SG	efei	afei
1PL.INCL	tifi	tafei
1PL.EXCL	mifi	'a'fei
2PL	mifi	'a'fei
3PL	rifi	riafei

'cry'
Person/Number	Realis	Irrealis
1SG	yotin	itan
2SG	utin	atan
3SG	etan	atan
1PL.INCL	titin	tatan
1PL.EXCL	mitin	'a'tan
2PL	mitin	'a'tan
3PL	ritin	riatan

'eat'
Person/Number	Realis	Irrealis
1SG	win	an
2SG	win	kin
3SG	an	an
1PL.INCL	tin	ta'an
1PL.EXCL	min	'e'kin
2PL	min	'e'kin
3PL	rin	riekin

'be'
Person/Number	Realis	Irrealis
1SG	wen	wan
2SG	wen	en
3SG	den	an
1PL.INCL	ten	tan
1PL.EXCL	men	'e'en
2PL	men	'e'en
3PL	ren	rie'en

== Notes ==
- Paradisec has two collections of Arthur Cappell's materials (AC1, AC2) that include Sobei language materials.
