= Kaptiau language =

Austronesian language spoken in Indonesia

Kaptiau
- Native to: Indonesia
- Region: Papua
- Native speakers: 230 (2006)
- Language family: Austronesian: Malayo-Polynesian; Oceanic; Western Oceanic; North New Guinea; Sarmi – Jayapura Bay; Sarmi; Kaptiau

Language codes
- ISO 639-3: kbi
- Glottolog: kapt1235

Kaptiau (Kapitiauw) is an Austronesian language spoken on the eastern north coast of Papua province, Indonesia.

== See also ==
- Sarmi languages for a comparison with related languages
