= Yamna language =

Oceanic language spoken in Indonesia

Yamna
- Sunum
- Native to: Indonesia
- Region: Papua
- Native speakers: 560 (2005)
- Language family: Austronesian: Malayo-Polynesian; Oceanic; Western Oceanic; North New Guinea; Sarmi – Jayapura Bay; Sarmi; Yamna

Language codes
- ISO 639-3: ymn
- Glottolog: yamn1237
- ELP: Yamna

Yamna, also known as Sunum, is an Austronesian language spoken on the coast and an island of Jayapura Bay in Papua province, Indonesia.

== See also ==
- Sarmi languages for a comparison with related languages
