= Kayupulau language =

Language of Western Papua

Kayupulau
- Native to: Indonesia
- Region: Jayapura, Papua
- Ethnicity: Kayu Pulau–Kayu Batu
- Native speakers: (50 cited 2000)
- Language family: Austronesian: Malayo-Polynesian; Oceanic; Western Oceanic; North New Guinea; Sarmi – Jayapura Bay; Jayapura Bay; Kayupulau

Language codes
- ISO 639-3: kzu
- Glottolog: kayu1243
- ELP: Kayupulau
- Kayupulau language is classified as Critically Endangered by the UNESCO Atlas of the World's Languages in Danger.

Kayupulau or Kayo Pulau is a nearly extinct Austronesian language spoken mainly by adults in Jayapura Harbor in Papua province, Indonesia. By 2007, it was used by less than a tenth of the ethnic population.
