= Masimasi language =

Language in Papua

Masimasi
- Native to: Indonesia
- Region: Papua
- Native speakers: 10 (2005)
- Language family: Austronesian: Malayo-Polynesian; Oceanic; Western Oceanic; North New Guinea; Sarmi – Jayapura Bay; Sarmi; Masimasi

Language codes
- ISO 639-3: ism
- Glottolog: masi1265
- ELP: Masimasi

Masimasi is a nearly extinct Austronesian language spoken on an offshore island of Papua, Indonesia.

== See also ==
- Sarmi languages for a comparison with related languages
