= Podena language =

Austronesian Sarmi language

Podena
- Fedan
- Native to: Indonesia
- Region: Papua
- Native speakers: 280 (2005)
- Language family: Austronesian: Malayo-Polynesian; Oceanic; Western Oceanic; North New Guinea; Sarmi – Jayapura Bay; Sarmi; Podena

Language codes
- ISO 639-3: pdn
- Glottolog: pode1237

Podena (Fedan) is one of the Austronesian Sarmi languages spoken on the coast of Jayapura Bay and on a nearby island in the Papua province of Indonesia.

== See also ==
- Sarmi languages for a comparison with related languages
