= Ormu language =

Language in Indonesia

Ormu
- Native to: Indonesia
- Region: Ormu Wari and Ormu Necheibe Villages, Raveni Rara, Papua
- Native speakers: (500 cited 2000)
- Language family: Austronesian: Malayo-Polynesian; Oceanic; Western Oceanic; North New Guinea; Sarmi – Jayapura Bay; Jayapura Bay; Ormu

Language codes
- ISO 639-3: orz
- Glottolog: ormu1248
- ELP: Ormu

Ormu is an Austronesian language spoken in Jayapura Bay specifically in Raveni Rara District, Jayapura Regency, Papua, Indonesia.
