= Tarpia language =

Oceanic language spoken in Indonesia

Tarpia
- Tarfia, Kamdera
- Native to: Indonesia
- Region: Papua
- Native speakers: 630 (2006)
- Language family: Austronesian: Malayo-Polynesian; Oceanic; Western Oceanic; North New Guinea; Sarmi – Jayapura Bay; Sarmi; Tarpia

Language codes
- ISO 639-3: tpf
- Glottolog: tarp1240
- ELP: Tarpia

Tarpia (Tarfia, Kamdera) is an Austronesian language spoken on the eastern north coast of Papua province, Indonesia.

== See also ==
- Sarmi languages for a comparison with related languages
