= Wakde language =

Language spoken in Indonesia

Wakde
- Mo
- Native to: Indonesia
- Region: Papua
- Native speakers: 550 (2005)
- Language family: Austronesian: Malayo-Polynesian; Oceanic; Western Oceanic; North New Guinea; Sarmi – Jayapura Bay; Sarmi; Wakde

Language codes
- ISO 639-3: wkd
- Glottolog: wakd1237

Wakde, also known as Mo, is an Austronesian language spoken on the coast and on Wakde Island of Papua province, Indonesia.

== See also ==
- Sarmi languages for a comparison with related languages
