= Verb-initial word order =

Linguistic classification

In syntax, verb-initial (V1) word order is a word order in which the verb appears before the subject and the object. In the more narrow sense, this term is used specifically to describe the word order of V1 languages (a V1 language being a language where the word order is obligatorily or predominantly verb-initial). V1 clauses only occur in V1 languages and other languages with a dominant V1 order displaying other properties that correlate with verb-initiality and that are crucial to many analyses of V1. V1 languages are estimated to make up 12–19% of the world’s languages.

V1 languages constitute a diverse group from different language families. They include Afroasiatic, Biu-Mandara, Surmic, and Nilo-Saharan languages in Africa; Celtic languages in Europe; Mayan and Oto-Manguean languages in North and Central America; Salish, Wakashan, and Tsimshianic languages in North America; Arawakan languages in South America; Austronesian languages in Southeast Asia. Some languages are ordered strictly as verb–subject–object (VSO), for example Q’anjob’al (Mayan). Others are ordered strictly as verb–object–subject (VOS), for example Malagasy (Austronesian). Many alternate between VSO and VOS, an example being Ojibwe (Algonquian).

== Examples ==
The following examples illustrate the rigid VOS and VSO languages and the VOS/VSO-alternating languages:

Q’anjob’al (VSO)

Max-ø y-uk’ ix ix kapey.
PERF-3ABS 3ERG-drink CL woman coffee
'The woman drank coffee.'

Malagasy (VOS)

N-ahita ny voalavo ny akoho.
PST-see DET rat DET chicken
'The chicken saw the rat.'

Ojibwe (VOS/VSO)

W-gii-sham-a-an kwe miin-an binoojiny-an.
3ERG-PST-feed-3ANIM-OBV woman blueberries-OBV child-OBV
'The woman fed the blueberries to the child.'

W-gii-sham-a-an miin-an kwe binoojiny-an.
3ERG-PST-feed-3ANIM-OBV blueberries-OBV woman child-OBV
'The woman fed the blueberries to the child.'

== Word-order correlations ==
Verb-initial languages pattern with SVO languages on many of their word orders. The similarity between the word orders typical for both verb-initial languages and SVO languages has led many typologists to refer to all of these as simply VO languages. According to Matthew Dryer’s 1992 study of a worldwide sample of languages, the majority of VO languages (of which verb-initial languages are a subtype) have the following word order tendencies:

Strong tendencies:

- Adjective comes before standard of comparison
- Verb comes before adpositional phrase
- Adpositions come before the noun phrase (i.e. they are prepositions)
- Verb comes before manner adverb
- Copula comes before nominal or adjectival predicate
- Auxiliary comes before verb (for those languages that have auxiliaries)
- Negative auxiliary comes before verb (for those languages that have negative auxiliaries)
- Complementizer comes before sentence
- Adverbial subordinator comes before sentence

Weak tendencies:

- Head noun comes before genitive noun
- Question particle comes before sentence (in those languages that have question particles)
- Article comes before noun (in those languages that have articles)

== Theoretical approaches ==
=== Functionalist approach ===
Many functional linguists do not posit an underlying syntactic tree in which a verb-initial language is SVO. Rather than try to find ways to derive the structures of verb-initial languages from underlyingly SVO structures, functional linguists would look at how cognitive principles make it possible for languages to have different word orders and why certain word orders are more common, less common, or almost non-existent. Russell Tomlin (in his 1986 paper "Basic word order. Functional principles") argued that there are three cognitively grounded principles which can account for the observed distributions of the frequencies of word order in human languages. The three principles are:

- Topic-first principle (more topical NPs come before less topical NPs)
- Animate-first principle (NPs with more animate referents come before NPs with less animate referents)
- Verb-object bonding principle (objects are more closely linked to the verb than subjects are)

Since subjects are generally more likely than objects to be topics and to have animate referents, the topic-first principle and the animate-first principle both cause a strong tendency in languages to prefer the subject to go before the object. Thus, languages where the object comes before the subject are rare.

Of the three possible word orders in which the subject comes before the object (VSO, SVO, and SOV), the VSO is less common because of the verb-object bonding principle, which states that objects tend to be more closely tied to verbs than subjects are (which is supported by phenomena such as object incorporation being found in many languages). Because of this principle, the two orders in which the object and verb are placed next to each other (SVO and SOV) are more common than VSO.

The way the three principles interact to produce stark differences in frequencies between the word orders is illustrated by the table below (the assumption is that the more of the three principles a particular word order satisfies the more frequent it would be):

| | Verb-object bonding principle | Topic-first principle | Animate-first principle |
|---|---|---|---|
| SOV | yes | yes | yes |
| SVO | yes | yes | yes |
| VSO | no | yes | yes |
| VOS | yes | no | no |
| OVS | yes | no | no |
| OSV | no | no | no |

According to the table above, the application of these three principles would predict the following hierarchy in the relative frequencies of word order:

SOV=SVO > VSO > VOS=OVS > OSV

This prediction roughly corresponds to the real frequencies observed in the world's languages:

- SOV: 44.8%
- SVO: 41.8%
- VSO: 9.2%
- VOS: 3.0%
- OVS: 1.2%
- OSV: 0.0%

=== Generative approach ===
There are a number of different solutions proposed for deriving V1 word order in the generative framework. These solutions include the movement of the verb or verbal phrase from traditional SVO sentences, lowering the subject from a higher position, such as Spec-IP to adjoin to a projection of the verb, or stipulating that the specifier is right branching instead of the more common left branching specifiers found in X-bar theory.

==== Verb movement ====
A common analysis for V1 word order is the head-raising of the verb from a base-generated SVO sentence into a position higher than the subject. This is a popular proposal for Irish and other Celtic languages, but also has been applied to Afroasiatic V1 languages such as Berber and Arabic (Ouhalla 1994). The V0 raising account has also been proposed for a number of Austronesian languages, but there is no existing proposal for Mayan languages.

To derive VSO word order, the verb raises through head movement and raises to either C or T.

Deriving VOS order through V head-raising is less straightforward. The common solution is scrambling, which has been proposed for deriving Tongan (Otsuka 2002) and Tagalog (Rackowski 2002) sentences. The scrambling mechanism involves the object moving to a high position, such as Spec-TP (Otsuka 2002), in order to check information structure features.

The head-movement analysis is motivated by ellipsis data in Celtic and Semitic languages, and by verb-adjacent particles and adverbs in Austronesian languages.

In Irish, eliding all postverbal arguments is possible, suggesting that the subject and the object belong to one functional projection, and the verb is outside of it (McCloskey 1991).

In Tagalog, there can be adverbs between the verb and the object in VOS order, implying that the verb and the object can be separated, and do not form a constituent. In Tongan, there is an asymmetry between case-marked arguments and clitic pronouns: the clitics surface pre-verbally, whereas the case-marked nouns can only surface post-verbally (Otsuka 2005). Otsuka (2005) proposed that the subject clitic undergoes head-movement to T0, and attaches to the verb, whereas the case-marked subject moves to Spec-TP. She concludes that only verb head-movement can explain such a syntactic asymmetry in Tongan.

==== Phrasal movement ====
V1 word order can also be analyzed as a derivation from the more common SVO order through verbal phrase movement. This solution is commonly proposed for Austronesian languages. Accounts on phrasal movement differ on 1) the highest maximal projection that moves (VP, vP, or TP), 2) the landing site of the moved phrase (Spec-TP or higher), and 3) the motivation for movement (generally agreed to be the EPP).

VOS order can be derived straightforwardly by raising the VP to a specifier position in a higher projection, such as the TP.

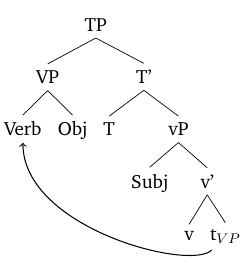
VP movement to derive VOS word order.

VSO order, on the other hand, has to be derived by remnant movement of the VP after evacuating the object from the phrase first.

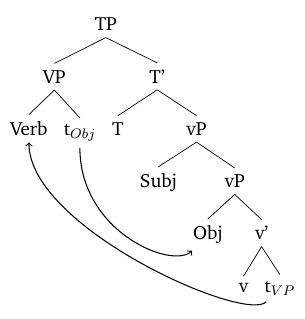
VP movement to derive VSO word order.

An argument for VP raising is the island constraints that arise in the VP in VOS sentences, due to The Freezing Principle, which says that there can be no movement out of a moved constituent.

Various Austronesian languages follow this constraint to various levels. Seediq for example is strict in that only VP-external constituents can go under A’-movement. Toba Batak, Tagalog, and Malagasy on the other hand, have this restriction only for VP-internal arguments, while allowing adverbs and indirect objects to surface clause-initially. One proposal to solve this problem is to propose that adjuncts evacuate from the VP, before it raises.

Mayan languages, on the other hand, do not have such a restriction. Ch'ol, for example, allows object extraction in WH-questions from VOS word orders. For such cases, it has been proposed that the object evacuates before the phrasal movement to a higher position than the subject, and thus can undergo WH-movement later.

==== Right-hand specifier ====
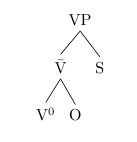
Verb phrase in X-bar structure with a right specifier.

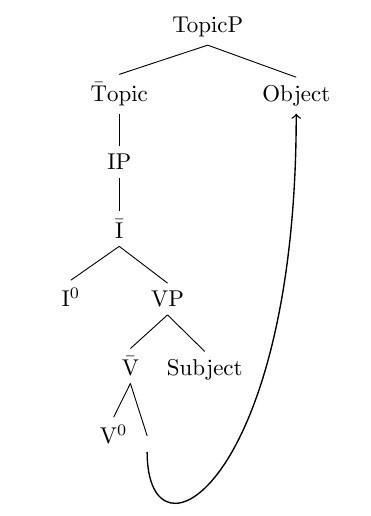
Demonstration of a possible derivation of VSO word order in a rightward specifier theory.

Some researchers have proposed deriving verb-initial word order by modifying the basic X-bar structure to permit right ward specifiers. This analysis has been particularly influential for Mayan languages, notably by Judith Aissen for Tzotzil. This is notable because it goes against standard X-bar theory and modern Minimalist theories where all specifiers are required to be leftward.

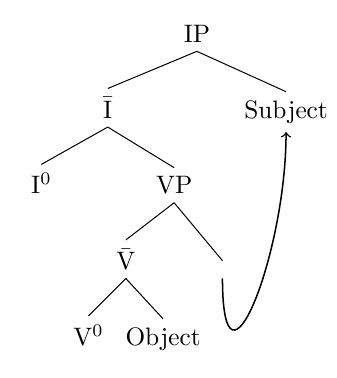
Derivation of VOS word order with subject movement in a rightward specifier theory.

The difference between VSO and VOS word orders in a right-hand specifier theory is accomplished via a combination of controlling which specifiers are right-ward and controlling which argument(s) moves. VOS word can be derived from the base positions of a VP with a right-specifier (note that the majority of this literature assumes the VP-Internal hypothesis). From the base position, VOS can also be derived by moving the subject up to any right-specifier position (e.g. the specifier of IP).

VSO word order is derived from the same base order. The object then moves to a right-specifier position above the VP (the specific landing site will vary from language to language).

Movement of either the subject or object arguments was originally motivated by positing an EPP feature on the landing site. Modern analyses are more likely to argue that movement is motivated by a need to give the argument case or for purposes of information structure.

==== Subject-lowering ====
Another type of approach to derive verb-initial word orders involves subject lowering, resulting in a structure in which the subject follows the verb. Whereas proposals for V-raising and VP-raising generally assume that the linear order of a sentence is derived in syntax, the subject lowering account assumes that phonological well-formedness determines the linear word order. Subject lowering has been proposed by Sabbagh (2013). He treats subject lowering as a prosodic phenomenon.

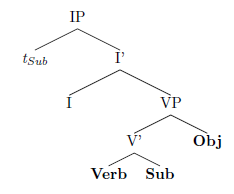
Basic syntactic structure featuring subject lowering.

The basic idea is as follows. After the syntactic derivation is done, the subject is in SpecIP/SpecTP. On its way to phonological realization, the end result of the syntactic derivation can be manipulated in order to satisfy phonological and morphological requirements. In the case of subject lowering, the subject will move to V and right-adjoin to it, as illustrated by the tree below (taken from Clemens & Polinsky).

Different languages are said to feature subject lowering, namely Berber (Choe 1987), Chamorro (Chung 1990, 1998), Tagalog (Sabbagh 2005, 2013).

As Clemens & Polinsky (2015) explain, support for subject lowering comes from coordination facts. When two sentences are coordinated, the subject must be able to have scope over the coordination, even though it shows up in a lower position in the clause. To be able to have this scope, the subject needs to occupy a high position in the syntactic derivation.

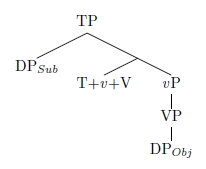
Syntactic structure of transitive sentence in Tagalog

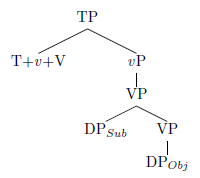
Subject lowering in syntactic structure of transitive sentence in Tagalog.

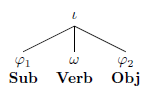
Prosodic structure of transitive sentence in Tagalog.

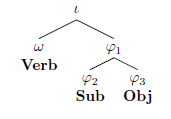
Subject lowering in prosodic structure of transitive sentence in Tagalog.

Sabbagh (2013) proposes a prosodic constraint to motivate subject lowering in Tagalog. This constraint is called Weak Start and it says that "[a] prosodic constituent begins with a leftmost daughter, which is no higher on the prosodic hierarchy than the constituent that immediately follows." This proposal is situated in Match Theory (Selkirk 2011). Match Theory states that clauses (CP and IP/TP) with illocutionary force correspond to intonational phrases (ɩ), XPs correspond to phonological phrases (φ), and X⁰s correspond to phonological words (ω). Sabbagh (2013) proposes that the prosodic hierarchy is as follows:

Prosodic hierarchy: ɩ > φ > ω.

The prosodic constraint Weak Start regulates the order in which different members of the hierarchy can appear in a single prosodic phrase. The hierarchy states that elements that are relatively high on the prosodic hierarchy need to be preceded by elements that are equal or lower to them on the prosodic hierarchy (Sabbagh 2013). In other words, phonological phrases (φ) need to be preceded by phonological words (ω).

This structure does not meet the requirement that Weak Start imposes on it (i.e. elements high on the prosodic hierarchy need to be preceded by elements that are equal or lower on the hierarchy). The subject, which is a phonological phrase (φ), precedes the verb, a phonological word (ω). This means that there is a mismatch between syntax and phonology. In other words, for syntactic reasons, the subject must be high (because of scope over coordinations), but for phonology, the subject needs to follow the verb, instead of preceding it. Lowering the subject resolves this mismatch. The structure after subject lowering is illustrated in the structures below.

In these structures the verb (ω) precedes the hierarchically higher subject (φ). This structure obeys Weak Start. Thus, subject lowering is applied in order to satisfy this prosodic structure constraint.

Syntactic structures involving subject lowering obey syntactic and phonological principles. The subject has moved to SpecIP/SpecTP, which gives it its necessary scope (as can be inferred from coordination structures). Lowering the subject in the prosodic structure causes the structure to obey the phonological constraint Weak Start as well.
