= Anus language =

Oceanic language spoken in Indonesia

Anus
- Korur
- Native to: Indonesia
- Region: Papua
- Native speakers: 320 (2005)
- Language family: Austronesian: Malayo-Polynesian; Oceanic; Western Oceanic; North New Guinea; Sarmi – Jayapura Bay; Sarmi; Anus

Language codes
- ISO 639-3: auq
- Glottolog: anus1237
- ELP: Anus

Anus, or Korur, is an Austronesian language spoken on an island in Jayapura Bay, east of the Tor River in Papua province of Indonesia. It is one of the Sarmi languages.
