= Bonggo language =

Austronesian language spoken in Indonesia

Bonggo
- Armopa, Rumbuai
- Native to: Indonesia
- Region: Bonggo District, Sarmi Regency, Papua
- Native speakers: 790 (2006)
- Language family: Austronesian: Malayo-Polynesian; Oceanic; Western Oceanic; North New Guinea; Sarmi – Jayapura Bay; Sarmi; Bonggo

Language codes
- ISO 639-3: bpg
- Glottolog: bong1287
- ELP: Bonggo

Bonggo, also known as Armopa or Rumbuai, is an Austronesian language spoken in Bonggo District, Sarmi Regency on the north coast of Papua province, Indonesia.

== See also ==
- Sarmi languages for a comparison with related languages
