= Verb–subject–object word order =

System of word ordering

In linguistic typology, a verb–subject–object (VSO) language has its most typical sentences arrange their elements in that order, as in Ate Sam apples (Sam ate apples). VSO is the third-most common word order among the world's languages, coming in a distant third after a near tie between SOV (as in Hindi and Japanese) and SVO (as in English and Mandarin Chinese), although these three orders, which all place the subject before the object, account for over 95% of languages.

== Incidence ==
| Order | Example | Usage | Languages |
|---|---|---|---|
| SOV | "Sam apples ate." | 45% | Ainu, Akkadian, Amharic, Ancient Greek, Armenian, Aymara, Bambara, Basque, Bengali, Burmese, Burushaski, Chukchi, Cushitic languages, Dravidian languages, Elamite, Hindustani, Hittite, Hopi, Itelmen, Japanese, Korean, Kurdish, Kurukh, Latin, Lhasa Tibetan, Manchu, Mongolian, Munda languages, Nahuatl, Navajo, Nepali, Nivkh, Northeast Caucasian languages, Northwest Caucasian languages, Pali, Pashto, Persian, Quechua, Sanskrit, Sinhala, Siouan-Catawban languages, Tamil, Tigrinya, Turkic languages, Yukaghir |
| SVO | "Sam ate apples." | 42% | Arabic (modern spoken varieties), Chinese (Mandarin, Cantonese, etc.), English, Estonian, Finnish, Hausa, Hebrew, Indonesian, Kashmiri, Malay, most European languages, Pa'O, Swahili, Thai, Vietnamese, Yucatec Maya |
| VSO | "Ate Sam apples." | 9% | Arabic (classical and modern standard), Berber languages, Biblical Hebrew, Celtic languages, Filipino, Geʽez, Kariri, Mayan languages, Polynesian languages |
| VOS | "Ate apples Sam." | 3% | Algonquian languages, Arawakan languages, Car, Chumash, Fijian, K'iche, Malagasy, Otomanguean languages, Qʼeqchiʼ, Salishan languages, Terêna |
| OVS | "Apples ate Sam." | 1% | Äiwoo, Hixkaryana, Urarina |
| OSV | "Apples Sam ate." | 0% | Haida, Tobati, Warao |
Frequency distribution of word order in languages surveyed by Russell S. Tomlin in the 1980s

Language families in which all or many of their members are VSO include the following:

- the Insular Celtic languages (including Irish, Scottish Gaelic, Manx, Welsh, Cornish and Breton)
- the Afroasiatic languages (including Berber, Assyrian, Egyptian, Classical and Modern Standard Arabic, Biblical Hebrew, and Geʽez)
- the Austronesian languages (including Tagalog, Visayan, Pangasinan, Kapampangan, Kadazan Dusun, Hawaiian, Māori, and Tongan).
- the Salishan languages
- many Mesoamerican languages, such as the Mayan languages and Oto-Manguean languages
- many Nilotic languages (including Nandi and Maasai)

Many languages, such as Greek, have relatively free word order, where VSO is one of many possible orders. Other languages, such as Spanish and Romanian, allow rather free subject-verb inversion. However, the most basic, common, and unmarked form in these languages is SVO, so they are classified as SVO languages.

== Examples ==
=== Semitic languages ===
Standard Arabic is an example of a language that uses VSO:

يَقْرَأُ ٱلْمُدَرِّسُ ٱلْكِتابَ
yaqraʼu l-mudarrisu l-kitāba
reads {the teacher} {the book}
verb subject object
The teacher reads the book

^* Arabic script is written right-to-left

Another Semitic language, Biblical Hebrew, uses VSO, as in Genesis 1:1, which is seen here, and many other places in the Tanakh:

בָּרָא אֱלֹהִים אֵת הַשָּׁמַיִם
Bara Elohim et ha-shamayim...
created God PTCL^{**} {the heavens}
verb subject {} object
God created the heavens...

^**et is a particle marking the direct object of the verb.

^** The Hebrew script is written from right to left.

=== Celtic languages ===
In Welsh, some tenses use simple verbs, which are found at the beginning of the sentence and are followed by the subject and any objects. An example is the preterite:

Siaradodd Aled {y Gymraeg}
spoke Aled {DEF Welsh}
Verb Subject Object
Aled spoke Welsh.

Other tenses may use compound verbs in which the conjugated form of usually bod (to be) precedes the subject and other verb-nouns come after the subject. Objects then follow the final verb-noun. Here is the usual method of forming the present tense:

Mae Aled {yn siarad} {y Gymraeg}
is Aled V-N.speak {DEF Welsh}
{Aux. Verb} Subject Verb-Noun Object
Aled speaks Welsh.

In Irish, phrases also use VSO:

Itheann Seán arán
eat-PRS Seán bread
Verb Subject Object
Sean eats bread.

In Irish, in forming a question, the same order is used (with an interrogative particle in front):

An itheann tú arán
Q eat-PRS you bread
{Question part.} Verb Subject Object
Do you eat bread?

The typological classification of Breton syntax is problematic. It has been claimed that Breton has an underlying VSO character, but it appears at first sight that V2 is the most frequent pattern. That arises as a result of a process usually involving the subject noun phrase being fronted. It has been suggested that the fronting has arisen from a development in which clefting and fronting, which are very common in Celtic languages, became completely pervasive. A very similar development is seen in literary Middle Welsh but did not continue into Modern Welsh.

=== Austronesian languages ===
In Samoan, as in other Polynesian languages, the default word order is VSO, in which verbs and copulas are found at the beginning of a sentence. However, the object of the predicate can be emphasized by using a VOS order.

{Sā tuli} {e le tamāloa} {lona atali‘i}
{PAST chase} {ERG DEF man} {his son}
Verb Subject Object
The man chased his son.

== Inversion to VSO ==
There is some tendency in many languages to switch constructions for emphasis. Particularly, sentences in English poetry are sometimes written in VSO, and Early Modern English explicitly reflects the tacit VSO order that is found in Modern English by suppressing the imperative's now-understood subject. For example, "Gather ye rosebuds while ye may" contrasts with modern "Gather rosebuds while you may".

Arabic sentences use either SVO or VSO, depending on whether the subject or the verb is more important. Sociolinguistic factors also influence sentence structure: colloquial varieties of Arabic generally prefer SVO, but VSO is more common in Standard Arabic.

Non-VSO languages that use VSO in questions include English and many other Germanic languages such as German and Dutch, as well as French, Finnish, Maká, and Emilian.

In languages with V2 word order, such as most Germanic languages except for Modern English, as well as Ingush and Oʼodham, the verb is always the second element in a main clause. The subject precedes the verb by default, but if another word or phrase is put at the front of the clause, the subject is moved to the position immediately after the verb. For example, the German sentence Ich esse oft Rinderbraten (I often eat roast beef) is in the standard SVO word order, with the adverb oft (often) immediately after the verb. However, if that adverb is moved to the beginning of the sentence for emphasis, the subject ich (I) is moved to the third position, which places the sentence in VSO order: Oft esse ich Rinderbraten.

== See also ==
- Polish notation
- Category:Verb–subject–object languages
