= Tobati language =

Oceanic language spoken in Indonesia

Tobati
- Yotafa
- Native to: Indonesia
- Region: Papua
- Ethnicity: Tobati
- Native speakers: 100 (2007)
- Language family: Austronesian: Malayo-Polynesian; Oceanic; Western Oceanic; North New Guinea; Sarmi – Jayapura Bay; Jayapura Bay; Tobati

Language codes
- ISO 639-3: tti
- Glottolog: toba1266
- ELP: Tobati
- Tobati is classified as Severely Endangered by the UNESCO Atlas of the World's Languages in Danger.

Tobati, or Yotafa, is an Austronesian language within the Oceanic branch, from the Sarmi–Jayapura subfamily, in Jayapura bay in Papua province, Indonesia. Notably, Tobati displays a very rare object–subject–verb word order. It is spoken by the Tobati people.

Tobati was once thought to be a Papuan language because as recently as 1952, it had a characteristically Papuan subject–object–verb word order.

== Phonology ==
Consonants
		Labial	Labio- dental	Dental	Alveolar	Palatal	Velar
Nasal		m			n	ɲ	ŋ (Note: Before a vowel realized as [ŋɡ], otherwise nasalizes the preceding vowel.)
Stop	voiceless				t	c	k
Stop	voiced	b		d		d͡ʒ	
Fricative	voiceless	ɸ	f		s	ʃ	h (Note: Displays free variation as [h ~ ɦ ~ x ~ ɣ].)
Fricative	voiced						ɣ ~ ɰ
Approximant		w				j	ɣ ~ ɰ
Rhotic					r		

/f/ also shows allophony as [p]. However, it does not behave as a stop (see below).

Tobati has a five-vowel system of /a e i o u/, realized as [a ɛ i ɔ ʊ] in closed syllables.

=== Phonotactics ===
Tobati permits three consonants in the onset, and at most a single consonant or a nasal–stop cluster in the coda.

Nasal–stop clusters only permit a nasal and a stop of the same place of articulation. For the /nd/ sequence, /n/ becomes dental [n̪]. Neither the bilabial, consisting of /b/ and the /f/ allophone [p], nor palatal nasal–stop clusters distinguish voice (i.e. they are [pm ~ bm] and [cɲ ~ d͡ʒɲ] respectively). The /Nk/ sequence voices to [ŋɡ].

== Survival ==
In 1991, the language only had eight hundred speakers, according to the education office of Jayapura. Of those speakers, only six could speak it fluently. Those six were all over the age of sixty. This is caused by the growing importance of the national language, Bahasa Indonesia, to everyday life. Children learn that language instead of Tobati. Similarly, this modernisation has also lead to the extinction of some of the Tobati people's native practices, such as their sago farms and traditional arts, like dancing, singing, and poetry.
