= Toba Batak language =

Austronesian language spoken in North Sumatra province in Indonesia

Toba Batak
- Hata Batak Toba ᯂᯖ ᯅᯖᯂ᯲ ᯖᯬᯅ
- Batak written in Surat Batak (Batak script)
- Native to: Indonesia
- Region: Samosir Island (2° 30′ N, 99°), and to the east, south, and west of Toba Lake in north Sumatra.
- Ethnicity: Toba Batak
- Native speakers: 1,610,000 (2010 census)
- Language family: Austronesian: Malayo-Polynesian; Northwest Sumatra–Barrier Islands; Batak; Southern; Toba Batak
- Writing system: Latin, Batak alphabet

Official status
- Regulated by: Badan Pengembangan dan Pembinaan Bahasa

Language codes
- ISO 639-3: bbc
- Glottolog: bata1289

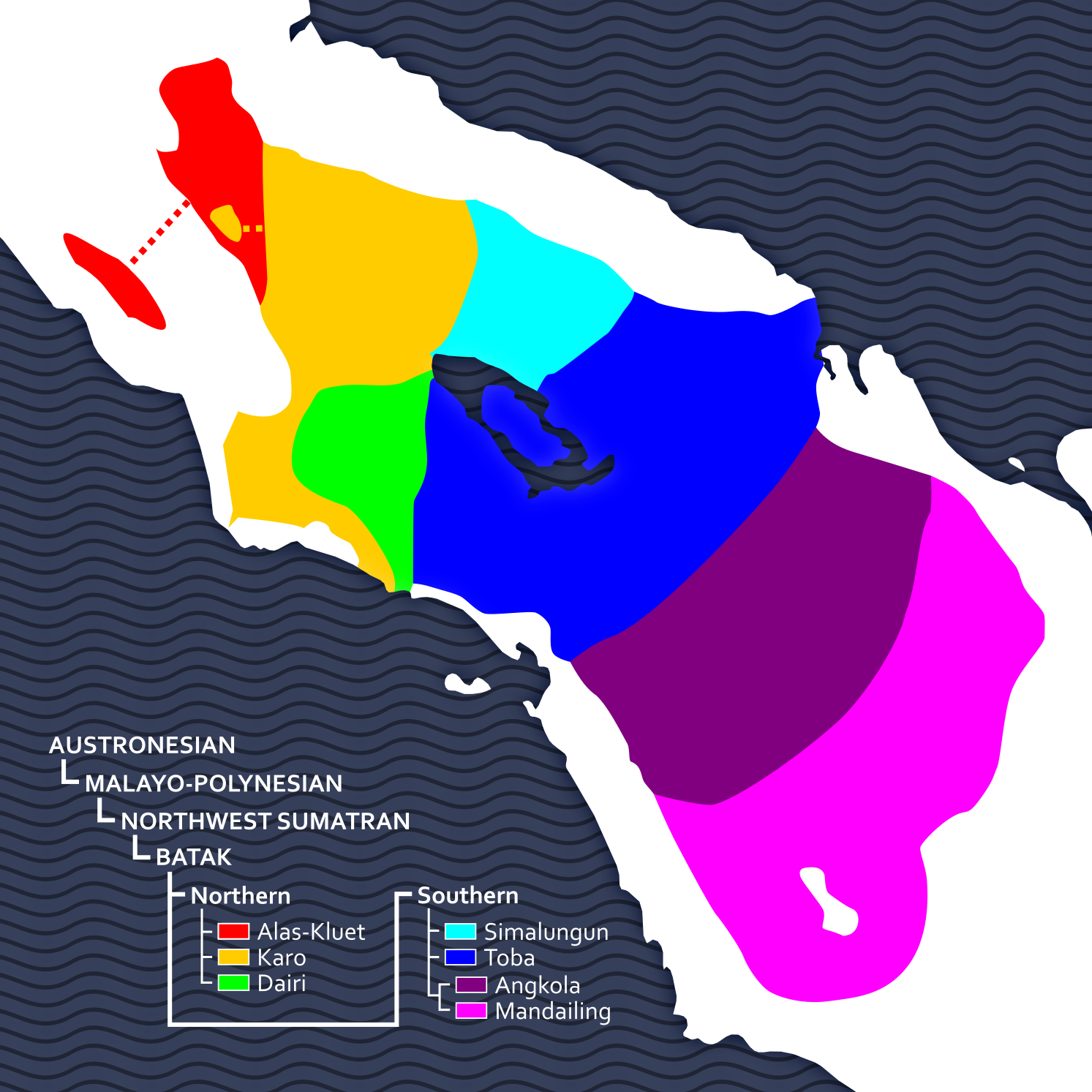
The distribution of Batak languages in northern Sumatra. Toba Batak is the majority language in the blue-colored areas labeled with its ISO 639-3 code "bbc".

A Toba Batak speaker.

Toba Batak (/ˈtoʊbə ˈbætək/) is an Austronesian language spoken in North Sumatra province in Indonesia. It is part of a group of languages called Batak. There are approximately 1,610,000 Toba Batak speakers, living to the east, west and south of Lake Toba. Historically it was written using the Batak script, but the Latin script is now used for most writing.

== Nomenclature ==
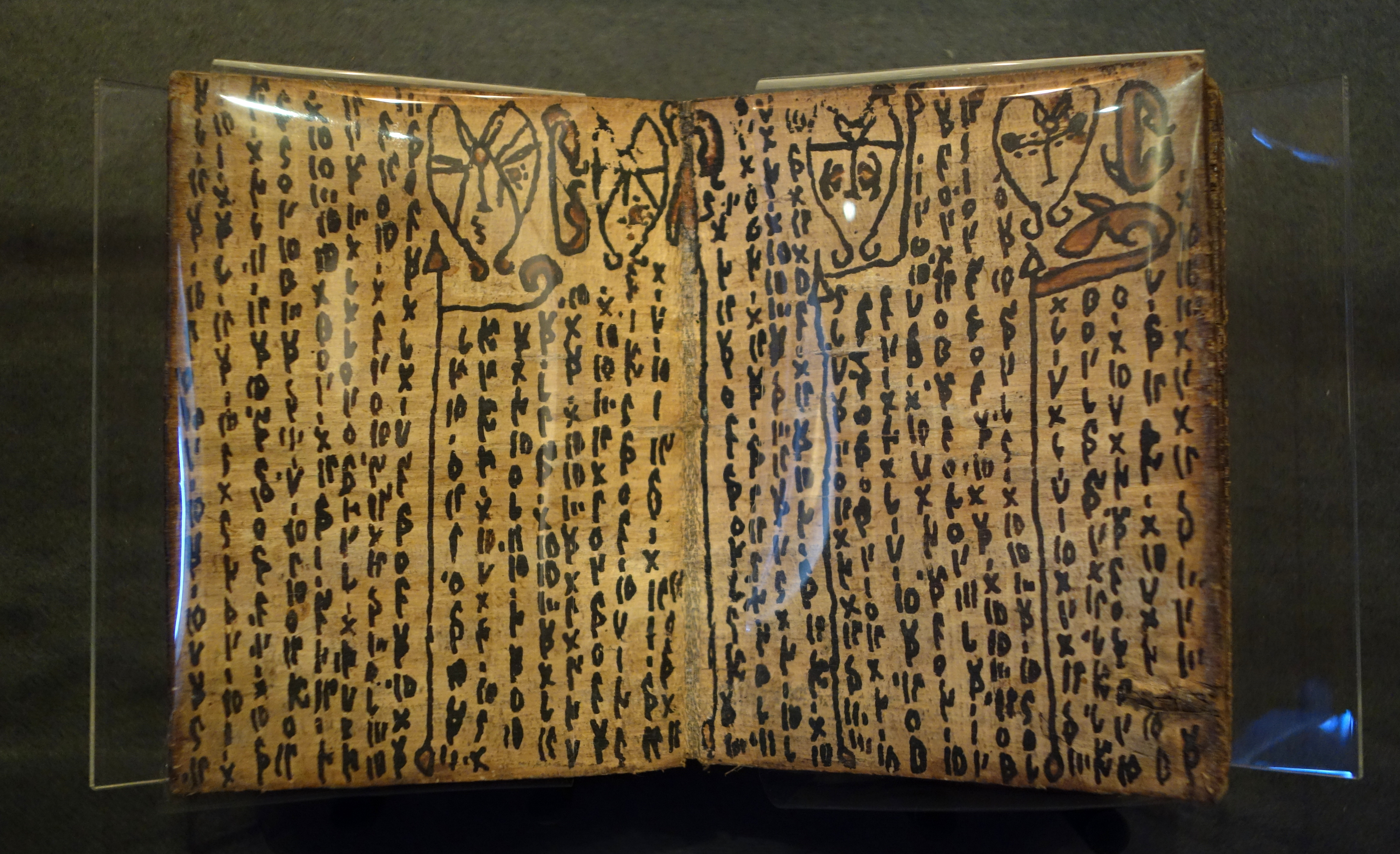
Manuscript in Toba Batak language, central Sumatra, early 1800s.

The name of this language arises from a rich and complex history of ethnic identity in colonial and post-colonial Indonesia. It is a generic name for the common language used by the people of the districts of Toba, Uluan, Humbang, Habinsaran, Samosir, and Silindung, centered upon the Island of Sumatra; more particularly, at Lake Toba. Linguistically and culturally these tribes of people are closely related. Other nearby communities such as Silalahi and Tongging may also be classified as speakers of Toba Batak.

The term Toba Batak is, itself, a derivation of the Toba Batak language. As such, it is used both as a noun and an adjective, both to describe a language, and also to describe the people who speak the language.

Among the aforementioned districts, Toba is the most densely populated and politically the most prominent district so that Toba Batak became a label for all communities speaking a dialect closely akin to the dialect spoken in Toba. In contemporary Indonesia the language is seldom referred to as Toba Batak (bahasa Batak Toba), but more commonly and simply as Batak (bahasa Batak). The (Toba)-Batak refer to it in their own language as Hata Batak. This "Batak" language is different from the languages of other Batak people that can be divided into speaking a northern Batak dialect (Karo Batak, and Pakpak-Dairi Batak – linguistically this dialect group also includes the culturally very different Alas people), a central Batak dialect (Simalungun) and closely related other southern Batak dialects such as Angkola and Mandailing.

== Background ==
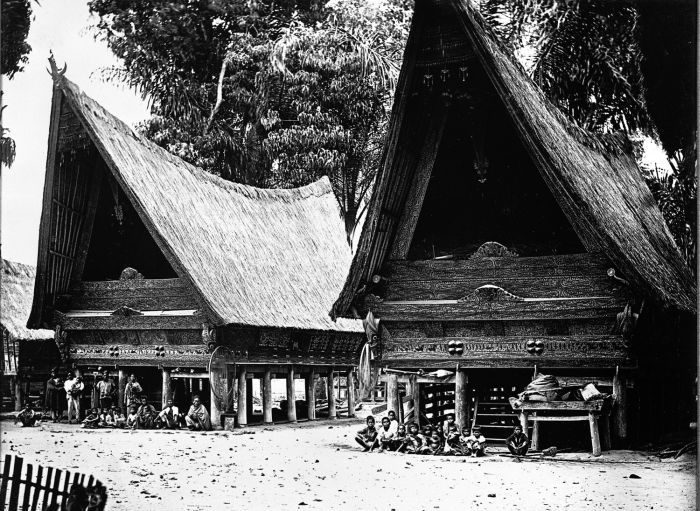
Toba Batak houses and residents in a photograph by Christiaan Benjamin Nieuwenhuis.

There are several dictionaries and grammars for each of the five major dialects of Batak (Angkola-Mandailing, Toba, Simalungun, Pakpak-Dairi, and Karo). Specifically for Toba Batak the most important dictionaries are that of Johannes Warneck (Toba-German) and Herman Neubronner van der Tuuk (Toba-Dutch). The latter was also involved in translating the Christian Bible into Toba Batak.

== Phonology ==
This description follows Nababan (1981).

=== Consonants ===
Toba Batak consonants
| | | Labial | Dental/ Alveolar | (Alveolo-) palatal | Velar | Glottal |
|---|---|---|---|---|---|---|
| Nasal | | m | n | | ŋ | |
| Plosive/ Affricate | voiceless | p | t | t͡ɕ | k | |
| Plosive/ Affricate | voiced | b | d | d͡ʑ | ɡ | |
| Fricative | | | s | | | h |
| Trill | | | r | | | |
| Approximant | | w | l | j | | |

In native words, /k/ and /h/ are in complementary distribution, where the latter only occurs when followed by vowels and not doubled, and the former elsewhere. Thus, hódok "perspiration" → hodohí "the perspiration", but dɔkkɔ́nɔn "will be invited". /k/ in other positions, are only recent developments from loanwords.

=== Vowels ===
Toba Batak vowels
| | Front | Central | Back |
|---|---|---|---|
| Close | i | | u |
| Close-mid | e | (ə) | o |
| Open-mid | ɛ | (ə) | ɔ |
| Open | | a | |

Note:

- /ə/ only occurs in loanwords from Indonesian.

=== Stress ===
Stress is phonemic, e.g. /'tibbo/ 'height' vs. /tib'bo/ 'high'; /'itɔm/ 'black dye' vs. /i'tɔm/ 'your sibling'.

=== Orthography ===
Toba Batak has a rather morphophonemic orthography, consonant clusters should be written instead of double consonants, thus clusters such as ⟨ngh⟩ actually represents double ⟨kk⟩ in pronunciation. In 2016, Surung Sihombing has criticized common orthographic errors in Toba Batak, regarded that the greeting Gokhon Dohot Jou-Jou on invitation cards should be correctly written instead as Gonghon Dohot Jou-Jou.

== Syntax ==
Toba Batak has verb-initial, VOS word order, as with many Austronesian languages. In (1), the verb mangallang 'eat' precedes the object kue 'cake', and the verb phrase precedes dakdanak i 'the child'.

Mangallang kue dakdanak i.
AT-eat cake child the
'The child is eating a cake.' (Silitonga 1973:3)

SVO word order (as in English), however, is also very common (Cole & Hermon 2008). In (2), the subject dakdanakon 'this child' precedes the verb phrase mangatuk biangi 'hit the dog'.

Dakdanak-on mang-atuk biang-i.
child-this ACT-hit dog-DEF
'This child hit the dog.' (Cole & Hermon 2008)

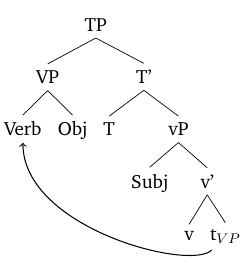
Figure 1: VP movement to derive VOS word order.

Cole and Hermon (2008) claim that VOS order is the result of VP-raising (specifically, of VoiceP) (Figure 1). Then, the subject may optionally raise over the verb phrase because of information structure. This analysis provides a basis for understanding Austronesian languages that have more fully become SVO (e.g. Indonesian: Chung 2008; Jarai: Jensen 2014).

Like many Austronesian languages (e.g. Tagalog), DP wh-movement is subject to an extraction restriction (e.g. Rackowski & Richards 2005). The verb in (3a) must agree with aha 'what' (in (3a): TT or "theme-topic") for it to be extracted in front of the verb. If the verb agrees with the subject, si John 'John' (in (3b): AT or "actor-topic"), aha 'what' may not extract.

Aha diida si John?
what TT.see PM John
'What did John see?' (Cole & Hermon 2008)

*Aha mangida si John?
what AT.see PM John
Intended: 'What did John see?' (Schachter 1984:126)
