= Object (grammar) =

Grammatical concept

In linguistics, an object is any of several types of arguments. In subject-prominent, nominative-accusative languages such as English, a transitive verb typically distinguishes between its subject and any of its objects, which can include but are not limited to direct objects, indirect objects, and arguments of adpositions (prepositions or postpositions); the latter are more accurately termed oblique arguments, thus including other arguments not covered by core grammatical roles, such as those governed by case morphology (as in languages such as Latin) or relational nouns (as is typical for members of the Mesoamerican Linguistic Area). In ergative-absolutive languages, for example most Australian Aboriginal languages, the term "subject" is ambiguous, and thus the term "agent" is often used instead to contrast with "object", such that basic word order is described as agent–object–verb (AOV) instead of subject–object–verb (SOV). Topic-prominent languages, such as Mandarin, focus their grammars less on the subject-object or agent-object dichotomies but rather on the pragmatic dichotomy of topic and comment.

== Types ==
=== English ===
In English traditional grammar types, three types of object are acknowledged: direct objects, indirect objects, and objects of prepositions. These object types are illustrated in the following table:

Type	Example
Direct object	She sees the dog
Indirect object	I gave the man salt
Object of preposition	You fish for salmon

Indirect objects are frequently expressed as objects of prepositions, complicating the traditional typology; e.g. "I gave salt to the man."

=== Other languages ===
Some Chinese verbs can have two direct objects, one being more closely bound to the verb than the other; these may be called "inner" and "outer" objects.

Secundative languages lack a distinction between direct and indirect objects, but rather distinguish primary and secondary objects. Many African languages fall into this typological category.

Several Slavic and agglutinating languages (e.g. Turkish, Hungarian, Finnish) use their case systems to differentiate between direct and indirect objects. The former is usually expressed in the accusative case, while the latter in the dative or allative case. Because of the structure of dative words in Hungarian, indirect objects are rather categorised as adjuncts, not objects.

== Syntactic category ==
While the typical object is a pronoun, noun, or noun phrase, objects can also appear as other syntactic categories, as illustrated in the following table for the English language:

Category	Example
Noun (phrase) or pronoun	The girl ate fruit.
that-clause	We remembered that we had to bring something.
Bare clause	We remembered we had to bring something.
for-clause	We were waiting for him to explain.
Interrogative clause	They asked what had happened.
Free relative clause	I heard what you heard.
Gerund (phrase or clause)	He stopped asking questions.
to-infinitive	Sam attempted to leave.
Cataphoric it	I believe it that she said that.
Prepositional phrase	The student submitted his homework to the teacher.

== Identification ==
A number of criteria can be employed for identifying objects, e.g.:

1. Subject of passive sentence: Most objects in active sentences can become the subject in the corresponding passive sentences.
2. Position occupied: In languages with strict word order, the subject and the object tend to occupy set positions in unmarked declarative clauses.
3. Morphological case: In languages that have case systems, objects are marked by certain cases (accusative, dative, genitive, instrumental, etc.).

Languages vary significantly with respect to these criteria. The first criterion identifies objects reliably most of the time in English, e.g.

- Fred gave me a book.
- A book was given (to) me.—Passive sentence identifies a book as an object in the starting sentence.
- I was given a book.—Passive sentence identifies me as an object in the starting sentence.

The second criterion is also a reliable criterion for analytic languages such as English, since the relatively strict word order of English usually positions the object after the verb(s) in declarative sentences. In the majority of languages with fixed word order, the subject precedes the object. However, the opposite is true for the very small proportion (approximately 2.9%) of the world's languages that utilize object–subject word order by default.

== Verb classes ==
Verbs can be classified according to the number and/or type of objects that they do or do not take. The following table provides an overview of some of the various verb classes:

Transitive verbs	Number of objects	Examples
Monotransitive	One object	I fed the dog.
Ditransitive	Two objects	You lent me a lawnmower.
Tritransitive	Three objects	I'll trade you this bicycle for your binoculars.
Intransitive verbs	Semantic role of subject	Examples
Unaccusative	Patient	The man stumbled twice, The roof collapsed.
Unergative	Agent	He works in the morning, They lie often.

Ergative and object-deletion verbs can be transitive or intransitive, as indicated in the following table:

Transitive	Example
Ergative	The submarine sank the freighter.
Object deletion	We have already eaten dinner.
Intransitive	Example
Ergative	The freighter sank.
Object deletion	We have already eaten.

The distinction drawn here between ergative and object-deletion verbs is based on the role of the subject. The object of a transitive ergative verb is the subject of the corresponding intransitive ergative verb. With object-deletion verbs, in contrast, the subject is consistent regardless of whether an object is or is not present.

== In sentence structure ==
Objects are distinguished from subjects in the syntactic trees that represent sentence structure. The subject appears (as high or) higher in the syntactic structure than the object. The following trees of a dependency grammar illustrate the hierarchical positions of subjects and objects:

The subject is in blue, and the object in orange. The subject is consistently a dependent of the finite verb, whereas the object is a dependent of the lowest non-finite verb if such a verb is present.

== See also ==
- Subject (grammar)
- Predicate (grammar)
- Dependency grammar
- Object pronoun
- Prepositional pronoun
- Transitive verb
- Intransitive verb
- Oblique case
- Differential object marking
- Subject–verb inversion in English
- predication
- predicand
- raising

== Literature ==
- Ágel, V., L. Eichinger, H.-W. Eroms, P. Hellwig, H. Heringer, and H. Lobin (eds.) 2003/6. Dependency and valency: An international handbook of contemporary research. Berlin: Walter de Gruyter.
- Biber, D. et al. 1999. Longman Grammar of spoken and written English. Essex, England: Pearson Education limited.
- Carnie, A. 2013. Syntax: A generative introduction, 3rd edition. Malden, MA: Wiley-Blackwell.
- Collins Cobuild English Grammar 1995. London: HarperCollins Publishers.
- Conner, J. 1968. A grammar of standard English. Boston: Houghton Mifflin Company.
- Freeborn, D. 1995. A course book in English grammar: Standard English and the dialects, 2nd edition. London: MacMillan Press LTD.
- Keenan, E. and B. Comrie 1977. Noun phrase accessibility and universal grammar. Linguistic Inquiry 8. 63–99.
- Kesner Bland, S. Intermediate grammar: From form to meaning and use. New York: Oxford University Press.
