= Language processing in the brain =

How humans use words to communicate

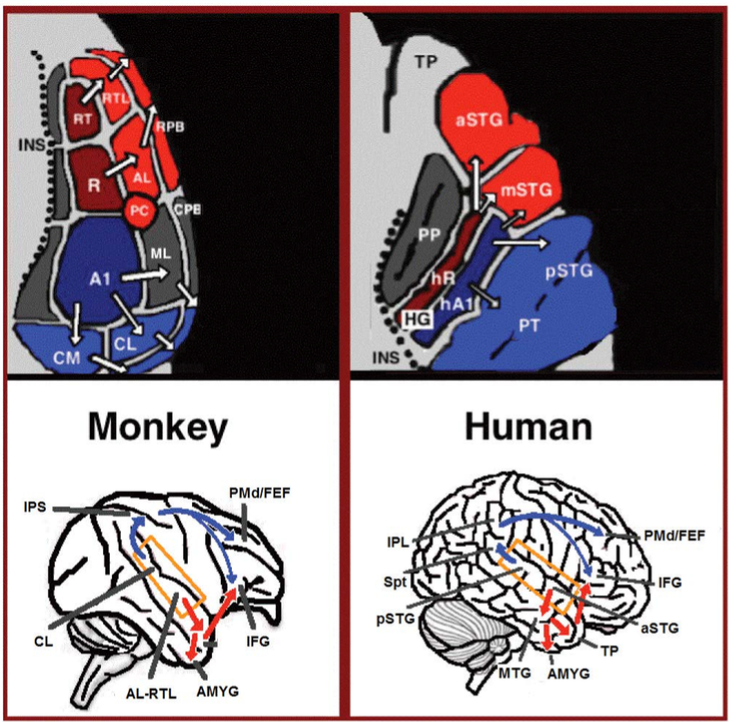
Dual stream connectivity between the auditory cortex and frontal lobe of monkeys and humans. Top: The auditory cortex of the monkey (left) and human (right) is schematically depicted on the supratemporal plane and observed from above (with the parieto- frontal operculi removed). Bottom: The brain of the monkey (left) and human (right) is schematically depicted and displayed from the side. Orange frames mark the region of the auditory cortex, which is displayed in the top sub-figures. Top and Bottom: Blue colors mark regions affiliated with the ADS, and red colors mark regions affiliated with the AVS (dark red and blue regions mark the primary auditory fields). Material was copied from this source, which is available under a Creative Commons Attribution 4.0 International License.

In psycholinguistics, language processing refers to the way humans use words to communicate ideas and feelings, and how such communications are processed and understood. Language processing is considered to be a uniquely human ability that is not produced with the same grammatical understanding or systematicity in even humans' closest primate relatives.

Language processing involves phonological, lexical, morphological, syntactic and semantic information. It includes retrieving stored word forms and meanings, processing the internal structure of words, and combining words into phrases and sentences. These processes interact with perceptual systems supporting auditory speech perception, reading and sign-language comprehension, and with motor systems supporting speech articulation. Language use also draws on attention and reasoning systems to select relevant information and interpret messages in context.

== Early neurolinguistics models ==
Language Areas of the human brain. The angular gyrus is represented in orange, supramarginal gyrus is represented in yellow, Broca's area is represented in blue, Wernicke's area is represented in green and the primary auditory cortex is represented in pink.

Throughout the 20th century, our knowledge of language processing in the brain was dominated by the Wernicke–Lichtheim–Geschwind model. The Wernicke–Lichtheim–Geschwind model is primarily based on research conducted on brain-damaged individuals who were reported to possess a variety of language related disorders. In accordance with this model, words are perceived via a specialized word reception center (Wernicke's area) that is located in the left temporoparietal junction. This region then projects to a word production center (Broca's area) that is located in the left inferior frontal gyrus. Because almost all language input was thought to funnel via Wernicke's area and all language output to funnel via Broca's area, it became extremely difficult to identify the basic properties of each region. This lack of clear definition for the contribution of Wernicke's and Broca's regions to human language rendered it extremely difficult to identify their homologues in other primates. With the advent of the fMRI and its application for lesion mappings, however, it was shown that this model is based on incorrect correlations between symptoms and lesions. The refutation of such an influential and dominant model opened the door to new models of language processing in the brain.

== Current neurolinguistics models ==
Classical insights emphasized localized language centres and the pathways connecting them. Modern models increasingly describe language processing through the coordinated activity of distributed neural networks. This network perspective links the organization of brain regions and their connections to specific processing mechanisms, such as retrieving linguistic knowledge and combining it into larger structures.

=== The frontotemporal language network ===
The frontotemporal language network includes language-responsive regions within the inferior and middle frontal gyri and the lateral temporal cortex, extending from anterior temporal regions to posterior superior and middle temporal areas. Their activity is strongly correlated during language processing, indicating functional coordination. Structural connections include dorsal pathways through the arcuate and superior longitudinal fasciculi, and ventral pathways through the extreme capsule, linking temporal regions with frontal cortex. This network supports access to linguistic knowledge and the combination of phonological, morphological, syntactic and semantic information into larger structures during comprehension and production.

=== The auditory pathway ===
Throughout the 20th century the dominant model for language processing in the brain was the Geschwind–Lichteim–Wernicke model, which is based primarily on the analysis of brain-damaged patients. However, due to improvements in intra-cortical electrophysiological recordings of monkey and human brains, as well non-invasive techniques such as fMRI, PET, MEG and EEG, an auditory pathway consisting of two parts has been revealed and a two-streams model has been developed. In accordance with this model, two pathways connect the auditory cortex to the frontal lobe, each pathway accounting for different linguistic roles. The auditory ventral stream pathway is responsible for sound recognition, and is accordingly known as the auditory 'what' pathway. The auditory dorsal stream in both humans and non-human primates is responsible for sound localization, and is accordingly known as the auditory 'where' pathway. In humans, this pathway (especially in the left hemisphere) is also responsible for speech production, speech repetition, lip-reading, and phonological working memory and long-term memory. In accordance with the 'from where to what' model of language evolution, The reason the ADS is characterized with such a broad range of functions is that each indicates a different stage in language evolution.

The division of the two streams first occurs in the auditory nerve where the anterior branch enters the anterior cochlear nucleus in the brainstem which gives rise to the auditory ventral stream. The posterior branch enters the dorsal and posteroventral cochlear nucleus to give rise to the auditory dorsal stream.

==== Anatomy ====
In the last two decades, significant advances occurred in our understanding of the neural processing of sounds in primates. Initially by recording of neural activity in the auditory cortices of monkeys and later elaborated via histological staining and fMRI scanning studies, 3 auditory fields were identified in the primary auditory cortex, and 9 associative auditory fields were shown to surround them (Figure 1 top left). Anatomical tracing and lesion studies further indicated of a separation between the anterior and posterior auditory fields, with the anterior primary auditory fields (areas R-RT) projecting to the anterior associative auditory fields (areas AL-RTL), and the posterior primary auditory field (area A1) projecting to the posterior associative auditory fields (areas CL-CM). Recently, evidence accumulated that indicates homology between the human and monkey auditory fields. In humans, histological staining studies revealed two separate auditory fields in the primary auditory region of Heschl's gyrus, and by mapping the tonotopic organization of the human primary auditory fields with high resolution fMRI and comparing it to the tonotopic organization of the monkey primary auditory fields, homology was established between the human anterior primary auditory field and monkey area R (denoted in humans as area hR) and the human posterior primary auditory field and the monkey area A1 (denoted in humans as area hA1). Intra-cortical recordings from the human auditory cortex further demonstrated similar patterns of connectivity to the auditory cortex of the monkey. Recording from the surface of the auditory cortex (supra-temporal plane) reported that the anterior Heschl's gyrus (area hR) projects primarily to the middle-anterior superior temporal gyrus (mSTG-aSTG) and the posterior Heschl's gyrus (area hA1) projects primarily to the posterior superior temporal gyrus (pSTG) and the planum temporale (area PT; Figure 1 top right). Consistent with connections from area hR to the aSTG and hA1 to the pSTG is an fMRI study of a patient with impaired sound recognition (auditory agnosia), who was shown with reduced bilateral activation in areas hR and aSTG but with spared activation in the mSTG-pSTG. This connectivity pattern is also corroborated by a study that recorded activation from the lateral surface of the auditory cortex and reported simultaneous non-overlapping activation clusters in the pSTG and mSTG-aSTG while listening to sounds.

Downstream to the auditory cortex, anatomical tracing studies in monkeys delineated projections from the anterior associative auditory fields (areas AL-RTL) to ventral prefrontal and premotor cortices in the inferior frontal gyrus (IFG) and amygdala. Cortical recording and functional imaging studies in macaque monkeys further elaborated on this processing stream by showing that acoustic information flows from the anterior auditory cortex to the temporal pole (TP) and then to the IFG. This pathway is commonly referred to as the auditory ventral stream (AVS; Figure 1, bottom left-red arrows). In contrast to the anterior auditory fields, tracing studies reported that the posterior auditory fields (areas CL-CM) project primarily to dorsolateral prefrontal and premotor cortices (although some projections do terminate in the IFG. Cortical recordings and anatomical tracing studies in monkeys further provided evidence that this processing stream flows from the posterior auditory fields to the frontal lobe via a relay station in the intra-parietal sulcus (IPS). This pathway is commonly referred to as the auditory dorsal stream (ADS; Figure 1, bottom left-blue arrows). Comparing the white matter pathways involved in communication in humans and monkeys with diffusion tensor imaging techniques indicates of similar connections of the AVS and ADS in the two species (Monkey, Human). In humans, the pSTG was shown to project to the parietal lobe (sylvian parietal-temporal junction-inferior parietal lobule; Spt-IPL), and from there to dorsolateral prefrontal and premotor cortices (Figure 1, bottom right-blue arrows), and the aSTG was shown to project to the anterior temporal lobe (middle temporal gyrus-temporal pole; MTG-TP) and from there to the IFG (Figure 1 bottom right-red arrows).

==== Auditory ventral stream ====
The auditory ventral stream (AVS) connects the auditory cortex with the middle temporal gyrus and temporal pole, which in turn connects with the inferior frontal gyrus. This pathway is responsible for sound recognition, and is accordingly known as the auditory 'what' pathway. The functions of the AVS include the following.

===== Sound recognition =====
Accumulative converging evidence indicates that the AVS is involved in recognizing auditory objects. At the level of the primary auditory cortex, recordings from monkeys showed higher percentage of neurons selective for learned melodic sequences in area R than area A1, and a study in humans demonstrated more selectivity for heard syllables in the anterior Heschl's gyrus (area hR) than posterior Heschl's gyrus (area hA1). In downstream associative auditory fields, studies from both monkeys and humans reported that the border between the anterior and posterior auditory fields (Figure 1-area PC in the monkey and mSTG in the human) processes pitch attributes that are necessary for the recognition of auditory objects. The anterior auditory fields of monkeys were also demonstrated to be selective for conspecific vocalizations with intracortical recordings. and functional imaging One fMRI monkey study further demonstrated a role of the aSTG in the recognition of individual voices. The role of the human mSTG-aSTG in sound recognition was demonstrated via functional imaging studies that correlated activity in this region with isolation of auditory objects from background noise, and with the recognition of spoken words, voices, melodies, environmental sounds, and non-speech communicative sounds. A meta-analysis of fMRI studies further demonstrated functional dissociation between the left mSTG and aSTG, with the former processing short speech units (phonemes) and the latter processing longer units (e.g., words, environmental sounds). A study that recorded neural activity directly from the left pSTG and aSTG reported that the aSTG, but not pSTG, was more active when the patient listened to speech in her native language than an unfamiliar foreign language. Consistently, electro stimulation to the aSTG of this patient resulted in impaired speech perception (see also for similar results). Intra-cortical recordings from the right and left aSTG further demonstrated that speech is processed laterally to music. An fMRI study of a patient with impaired sound recognition (auditory agnosia) due to brainstem damage was also shown with reduced activation in areas hR and aSTG of both hemispheres when hearing spoken words and environmental sounds. Recordings from the anterior auditory cortex of monkeys while maintaining learned sounds in working memory, and the debilitating effect of induced lesions to this region on working memory recall, further implicate the AVS in maintaining the perceived auditory objects in working memory. In humans, area mSTG-aSTG was also reported active during rehearsal of heard syllables with MEG. and fMRI The latter study further demonstrated that working memory in the AVS is for the acoustic properties of spoken words and that it is independent of working memory in the ADS, which mediates inner speech. Working memory studies in monkeys also suggest that in monkeys, in contrast to humans, the AVS is the dominant working memory store.

In humans, downstream to the aSTG, the MTG and TP are thought to constitute the semantic lexicon, which is a long-term memory repository of audio-visual representations that are interconnected on the basis of semantic relationships. (See also the reviews by discussing this topic). The primary evidence for this role of the MTG-TP is that patients with damage to this region (e.g., patients with semantic dementia or herpes simplex virus encephalitis) are reported with an impaired ability to describe visual and auditory objects and a tendency to commit semantic errors when naming objects (i.e., semantic paraphasia). Semantic paraphasias were also expressed by aphasic patients with left MTG-TP damage and were shown to occur in non-aphasic patients after electro-stimulation to this region. or the underlying white matter pathway Two meta-analyses of the fMRI literature also reported that the anterior MTG and TP were consistently active during semantic analysis of speech and text; and an intra-cortical recording study correlated neural discharge in the MTG with the comprehension of intelligible sentences.

===== Sentence comprehension =====
In addition to extracting meaning from sounds, the MTG-TP region of the AVS appears to have a role in sentence comprehension, possibly by merging concepts together (e.g., merging the concept 'blue' and 'shirt' to create the concept of a 'blue shirt'). The role of the MTG in extracting meaning from sentences has been demonstrated in functional imaging studies reporting stronger activation in the anterior MTG when proper sentences are contrasted with lists of words, sentences in a foreign or nonsense language, scrambled sentences, sentences with semantic or syntactic violations and sentence-like sequences of environmental sounds. One fMRI study in which participants were instructed to read a story further correlated activity in the anterior MTG with the amount of semantic and syntactic content each sentence contained. An EEG study that contrasted cortical activity while reading sentences with and without syntactic violations in healthy participants and patients with MTG-TP damage, concluded that the MTG-TP in both hemispheres participate in the automatic (rule based) stage of syntactic analysis (ELAN component), and that the left MTG-TP is also involved in a later controlled stage of syntax analysis (P600 component). Patients with damage to the MTG-TP region have also been reported with impaired sentence comprehension. See review for more information on this topic.

===== Bilaterality =====
In contradiction to the Wernicke–Lichtheim–Geschwind model that implicates sound recognition to occur solely in the left hemisphere, studies that examined the properties of the right or left hemisphere in isolation via unilateral hemispheric anesthesia (i.e., the WADA procedure) or intra-cortical recordings from each hemisphere provided evidence that sound recognition is processed bilaterally. Moreover, a study that instructed patients with disconnected hemispheres (i.e., split-brain patients) to match spoken words to written words presented to the right or left hemifields, reported vocabulary in the right hemisphere that almost matches in size with the left hemisphere (The right hemisphere vocabulary was equivalent to the vocabulary of a healthy 11-years old child). This bilateral recognition of sounds is also consistent with the finding that unilateral lesion to the auditory cortex rarely results in deficit in auditory comprehension (i.e., auditory agnosia), whereas a second lesion to the remaining hemisphere (which could occur years later) does. Finally, as mentioned earlier, an fMRI scan of an auditory agnosia patient demonstrated bilateral reduced activation in the anterior auditory cortices, and bilateral electro-stimulation to these regions in both hemispheres resulted with impaired speech recognition.

==== Auditory dorsal stream ====
The auditory dorsal stream connects the auditory cortex with the parietal lobe, which in turn connects with inferior frontal gyrus. In both humans and non-human primates, the auditory dorsal stream is responsible for sound localization, and is accordingly known as the auditory 'where' pathway. In humans, this pathway (especially in the left hemisphere) is also responsible for speech production, speech repetition, lip-reading, and phonological working memory and long-term memory.

===== Speech production =====
Studies of present-day humans have demonstrated a role for the ADS in speech production, particularly in the vocal expression of the names of objects. For instance, in a series of studies in which sub-cortical fibers were directly stimulated interference in the left pSTG and IPL resulted in errors during object-naming tasks, and interference in the left IFG resulted in speech arrest. Magnetic interference in the pSTG and IFG of healthy participants also produced speech errors and speech arrest, respectively One study has also reported that electrical stimulation of the left IPL caused patients to believe that they had spoken when they had not and that IFG stimulation caused patients to unconsciously move their lips. The contribution of the ADS to the process of articulating the names of objects could be dependent on the reception of afferents from the semantic lexicon of the AVS, as an intra-cortical recording study reported of activation in the posterior MTG prior to activation in the Spt-IPL region when patients named objects in pictures Intra-cortical electrical stimulation studies also reported that electrical interference to the posterior MTG was correlated with impaired object naming

Additionally, lesion studies of stroke patients have provided evidence supporting the dual stream model's role in speech production. Recent research using multivariate lesion/disconnectome symptom mapping has shown that lower scores in speech production tasks are associated with lesions and abnormalities in the left inferior parietal lobe and frontal lobe. These findings from stroke patients further support the involvement of the dorsal stream pathway in speech production, complementing the stimulation and interference studies in healthy participants.

===== Vocal mimicry =====
Although sound perception is primarily ascribed to the AVS, the ADS appears associated with several aspects of speech perception. For instance, in a meta-analysis of fMRI studies (Turkeltaub and Coslett, 2010), in which the auditory perception of phonemes was contrasted with closely matching sounds, and the studies were rated for the required level of attention, the authors concluded that attention to phonemes correlates with strong activation in the pSTG-pSTS region. An intra-cortical recording study in which participants were instructed to identify syllables also correlated the hearing of each syllable with its own activation pattern in the pSTG. The involvement of the ADS in both speech perception and production has been further illuminated in several pioneering functional imaging studies that contrasted speech perception with overt or covert speech production. These studies demonstrated that the pSTS is active only during the perception of speech, whereas area Spt is active during both the perception and production of speech. The authors concluded that the pSTS projects to area Spt, which converts the auditory input into articulatory movements. Similar results have been obtained in a study in which participants' temporal and parietal lobes were electrically stimulated. This study reported that electrically stimulating the pSTG region interferes with sentence comprehension and that stimulation of the IPL interferes with the ability to vocalize the names of objects. The authors also reported that stimulation in area Spt and the inferior IPL induced interference during both object-naming and speech-comprehension tasks. The role of the ADS in speech repetition is also congruent with the results of the other functional imaging studies that have localized activation during speech repetition tasks to ADS regions. An intra-cortical recording study that recorded activity throughout most of the temporal, parietal and frontal lobes also reported activation in the pSTG, Spt, IPL and IFG when speech repetition is contrasted with speech perception. Neuropsychological studies have also found that individuals with speech repetition deficits but preserved auditory comprehension (i.e., conduction aphasia) suffer from circumscribed damage to the Spt-IPL area or damage to the projections that emanate from this area and target the frontal lobe Studies have also reported a transient speech repetition deficit in patients after direct intra-cortical electrical stimulation to this same region. Insight into the purpose of speech repetition in the ADS is provided by longitudinal studies of children that correlated the learning of foreign vocabulary with the ability to repeat nonsense words.

===== Speech monitoring =====
In addition to repeating and producing speech, the ADS appears to have a role in monitoring the quality of the speech output. Neuroanatomical evidence suggests that the ADS is equipped with descending connections from the IFG to the pSTG that relay information about motor activity (i.e., corollary discharges) in the vocal apparatus (mouth, tongue, vocal folds). This feedback marks the sound perceived during speech production as self-produced and can be used to adjust the vocal apparatus to increase the similarity between the perceived and emitted calls. Evidence for descending connections from the IFG to the pSTG has been offered by a study that electrically stimulated the IFG during surgical operations and reported the spread of activation to the pSTG-pSTS-Spt region A study that compared the ability of aphasic patients with frontal, parietal or temporal lobe damage to quickly and repeatedly articulate a string of syllables reported that damage to the frontal lobe interfered with the articulation of both identical syllabic strings ("Bababa") and non-identical syllabic strings ("Badaga"), whereas patients with temporal or parietal lobe damage only exhibited impairment when articulating non-identical syllabic strings. Because the patients with temporal and parietal lobe damage were capable of repeating the syllabic string in the first task, their speech perception and production appears to be relatively preserved, and their deficit in the second task is therefore due to impaired monitoring. Demonstrating the role of the descending ADS connections in monitoring emitted calls, an fMRI study instructed participants to speak under normal conditions or when hearing a modified version of their own voice (delayed first formant) and reported that hearing a distorted version of one's own voice results in increased activation in the pSTG. Further demonstrating that the ADS facilitates motor feedback during mimicry is an intra-cortical recording study that contrasted speech perception and repetition. The authors reported that, in addition to activation in the IPL and IFG, speech repetition is characterized by stronger activation in the pSTG than during speech perception.

===== Integration of phonemes with lip-movements =====
Although sound perception is primarily ascribed to the AVS, the ADS appears associated with several aspects of speech perception. For instance, in a meta-analysis of fMRI studies in which the auditory perception of phonemes was contrasted with closely matching sounds, and the studies were rated for the required level of attention, the authors concluded that attention to phonemes correlates with strong activation in the pSTG-pSTS region. An intra-cortical recording study in which participants were instructed to identify syllables also correlated the hearing of each syllable with its own activation pattern in the pSTG. Consistent with the role of the ADS in discriminating phonemes, studies have ascribed the integration of phonemes and their corresponding lip movements (i.e., visemes) to the pSTS of the ADS. For example, an fMRI study has correlated activation in the pSTS with the McGurk illusion (in which hearing the syllable "ba" while seeing the viseme "ga" results in the perception of the syllable "da"). Another study has found that using magnetic stimulation to interfere with processing in this area further disrupts the McGurk illusion. The association of the pSTS with the audio-visual integration of speech has also been demonstrated in a study that presented participants with pictures of faces and spoken words of varying quality. The study reported that the pSTS selects for the combined increase of the clarity of faces and spoken words. Corroborating evidence has been provided by an fMRI study that contrasted the perception of audio-visual speech with audio-visual non-speech (pictures and sounds of tools). This study reported the detection of speech-selective compartments in the pSTS. In addition, an fMRI study that contrasted congruent audio-visual speech with incongruent speech (pictures of still faces) reported pSTS activation. For a review presenting additional converging evidence regarding the role of the pSTS and ADS in phoneme-viseme integration see.

Empirical research has demonstrated that visual lip movements enhance speech processing along the auditory dorsal stream, particularly in noisy conditions. Recent studies discovered that the dorsal stream regions, including frontal speech motor areas and supramarginal gyrus, show improved neural representations of speech sounds when visual lip movements are available.

===== Phonological long-term memory =====
A growing body of evidence indicates that humans, in addition to having a long-term store for word meanings located in the MTG-TP of the AVS (i.e., the semantic lexicon), also have a long-term store for the names of objects located in the Spt-IPL region of the ADS (i.e., the phonological lexicon). For example, a study examining patients with damage to the AVS (MTG damage) or damage to the ADS (IPL damage) reported that MTG damage results in individuals incorrectly identifying objects (e.g., calling a "goat" a "sheep," an example of semantic paraphasia). Conversely, IPL damage results in individuals correctly identifying the object but incorrectly pronouncing its name (e.g., saying "gof" instead of "goat," an example of phonemic paraphasia). Semantic paraphasia errors have also been reported in patients receiving intra-cortical electrical stimulation of the AVS (MTG), and phonemic paraphasia errors have been reported in patients whose ADS (pSTG, Spt, and IPL) received intra-cortical electrical stimulation. Further supporting the role of the ADS in object naming is an MEG study that localized activity in the IPL during the learning and during the recall of object names. A study that induced magnetic interference in participants' IPL while they answered questions about an object reported that the participants were capable of answering questions regarding the object's characteristics or perceptual attributes but were impaired when asked whether the word contained two or three syllables. An MEG study has also correlated recovery from anomia (a disorder characterized by an impaired ability to name objects) with changes in IPL activation. Further supporting the role of the IPL in encoding the sounds of words are studies reporting that, compared to monolinguals, bilinguals have greater cortical density in the IPL but not the MTG. Because evidence shows that, in bilinguals, different phonological representations of the same word share the same semantic representation, this increase in density in the IPL verifies the existence of the phonological lexicon: the semantic lexicon of bilinguals is expected to be similar in size to the semantic lexicon of monolinguals, whereas their phonological lexicon should be twice the size. Consistent with this finding, cortical density in the IPL of monolinguals also correlates with vocabulary size. Notably, the functional dissociation of the AVS and ADS in object-naming tasks is supported by cumulative evidence from reading research showing that semantic errors are correlated with MTG impairment and phonemic errors with IPL impairment. Based on these associations, the semantic analysis of text has been linked to the inferior-temporal gyrus and MTG, and the phonological analysis of text has been linked to the pSTG-Spt- IPL

===== Phonological working memory =====
Working memory is often treated as the temporary activation of the representations stored in long-term memory that are used for speech (phonological representations). This sharing of resources between working memory and speech is evident by the finding that speaking during rehearsal results in a significant reduction in the number of items that can be recalled from working memory (articulatory suppression). The involvement of the phonological lexicon in working memory is also evidenced by the tendency of individuals to make more errors when recalling words from a recently learned list of phonologically similar words than from a list of phonologically dissimilar words (the phonological similarity effect). Studies have also found that speech errors committed during reading are remarkably similar to speech errors made during the recall of recently learned, phonologically similar words from working memory. Patients with IPL damage have also been observed to exhibit both speech production errors and impaired working memory Finally, the view that verbal working memory is the result of temporarily activating phonological representations in the ADS is compatible with recent models describing working memory as the combination of maintaining representations in the mechanism of attention in parallel to temporarily activating representations in long-term memory. It has been argued that the role of the ADS in the rehearsal of lists of words is the reason this pathway is active during sentence comprehension For a review of the role of the ADS in working memory, see.

Studies have shown that performance on phonological working memory tasks correlates with properties of the left dorsal branch of the arcuate fasciculus (AF), which connects posterior temporal language regions with attention-regulating areas in the middle frontal gyrus. The arcuate fasciculus is a white matter pathway in the brain that contains two branches: a ventral branch connecting Wernicke's area with Broca's area and a dorsal branch connecting the posterior temporal region with the middle frontal gyrus. This dorsal branch appears to be particularly important for phonological working memory processes.

=== Basal ganglia and corticostriatal circuits ===
The caudate nucleus and putamen participate in circuits linking frontal cortex, basal ganglia and thalamus. Evidence implicates these circuits in language learning, sequencing and the selection of contextually appropriate linguistic responses, particularly when processing involves competition or uncertainty.

These contributions have been interpreted as aspects of broader mechanisms for cognitive control. The declarative/procedural model proposes that frontal–basal ganglia circuits support the gradual learning and automatization of grammatical regularities through procedural memory. Corticostriatal recurrent-network models explain incremental sentence interpretation through cortical activity that retains preceding linguistic context and learned corticostriatal connections that map this activity onto thematic roles, such as who performed an action and who received it.

=== Thalamus and thalamocortical connections ===
Language-related thalamic connections involve several nuclei, including the ventral anterior nucleus, mediodorsal nucleus and pulvinar, which connect with frontal and temporal cortical regions.

Neuroimaging and lesion evidence particularly implicates the thalamus in word retrieval, semantic processing and language production; meta-analytic findings also show that both thalami coactivate with bilateral frontotemporal regions during language tasks. Thalamus may regulate the responsiveness of cortical regions to task-relevant linguistic information. Recurrent-circuit accounts propose that cortico-thalamo-cortical pathways maintain stable representations while interacting cortical circuits transform and compare lexical and semantic information, progressively refining word choices or interpretations.

=== The cerebellum ===
Language-related activity frequently involves the right lateral cerebellum, particularly lateral lobule VI and Crus I/II. These regions interact with predominantly left-lateralized cerebral language regions through pathways involving the pontine nuclei, deep cerebellar nuclei and thalamus.

Clinical and neuroimaging evidence implicates these networks in verbal fluency, verbal working memory and sentence processing, alongside cerebellar contributions to articulation and speech timing. Cerebellar computations use learned contextual relationships to anticipate upcoming linguistic information, and use errors to update mappings between planned actions and their sensory consequences. Stimulation and imaging studies support involvement in linguistic prediction and responses to prediction violations. Modeling demonstrates that cerebellum-inspired circuits with feedforward and recurrent connections acquires prediction of future words and also function of syntactic recognition. Timing and sequencing accounts emphasize representing temporal relationships and organizing successive events, potentially supporting speech timing and the ordering of verbal material. Patient studies provide evidence for impaired organization of verbal sequences following cerebellar damage.

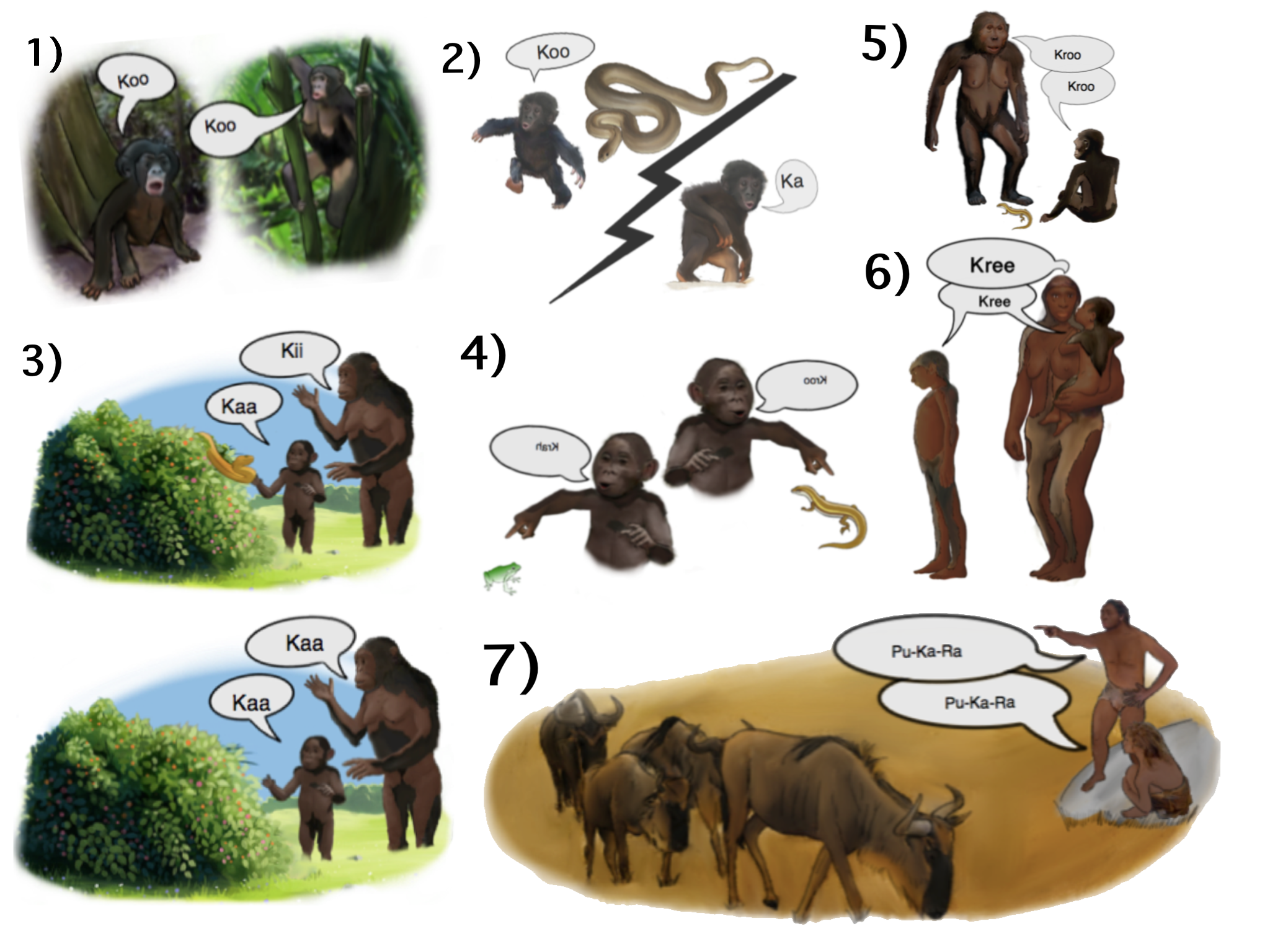
The 'from where to what' model of language evolution hypotheses 7 stages of language evolution.

== Linguistic theories ==
Language-processing research informs theories of language. The primary theoretical question is whether linguistic structures follow from the brain structures or vice versa. Externalist models, such as Ferdinand de Saussure's structuralism, argue that language as a social phenomenon is external to the brain. The individual receives the linguistic system from the outside, and the given language shapes the individual's brain.

This idea is opposed by internalist models including Noam Chomsky's transformational generative grammar, George Lakoff's Cognitive Linguistics, and John A. Hawkins's efficiency hypothesis. According to Chomsky, language is acquired from an innate brain structure independently of meaning. Lakoff argues that language emerges from the sensory systems. Hawkins hypothesizes that cross-linguistically prevalent patterns are based on the brain's natural processing preferences.

Additionally, models inspired by Richard Dawkins's memetics, including Construction Grammar and Usage-Based Linguistics, advocate a two-way model arguing that the brain shapes language, and language shapes the brain.

Evidence from neuroimaging studies points towards the externalist position. ERP studies suggest that language processing is based on the interaction of syntax and semantics, and the research does not support innate grammatical structures. MRI studies suggest that the structural characteristics of the child's first language shapes the processing connectome of the brain. Processing research has failed to find support for the inverse idea that syntactic structures reflect the brain's natural processing preferences cross-linguistically.

== The evolution of language ==
The auditory dorsal stream also has non-language related functions, such as sound localization and guidance of eye movements. Recent studies also indicate a role of the ADS in localization of family/tribe members, as a study that recorded from the cortex of an epileptic patient reported that the pSTG, but not aSTG, is selective for the presence of new speakers. An fMRI study of fetuses at their third trimester also demonstrated that area Spt is more selective to female speech than pure tones, and a sub-section of Spt is selective to the speech of their mother in contrast to unfamiliar female voices.

It is presently unknown why so many functions are ascribed to the human ADS. An attempt to unify these functions under a single framework was conducted in the 'From where to what' model of language evolution In accordance with this model, each function of the ADS indicates a different intermediate phase in the evolution of language. The roles of sound localization and integration of sound location with voices and auditory objects is interpreted as evidence that the origin of speech is the exchange of contact calls (calls used to report location in cases of separation) between mothers and offspring. The role of the ADS in the perception and production of intonations is interpreted as evidence that speech began by modifying the contact calls with intonations, possibly for distinguishing alarm contact calls from safe contact calls. The role of the ADS in encoding the names of objects (phonological long-term memory) is interpreted as evidence of a gradual transition from modifying calls with intonations to complete vocal control. The role of the ADS in the integration of lip movements with phonemes and in speech repetition is interpreted as evidence that spoken words were learned by infants mimicking their parents' vocalizations, initially by imitating their lip movements. The role of the ADS in phonological working memory is interpreted as evidence that the words learned through mimicry remained active in the ADS even when not spoken. This resulted in individuals capable of rehearsing a list of vocalizations, which enabled the production of words with several syllables. Further developments in the ADS enabled the rehearsal of lists of words, which provided the infrastructure for communicating with sentences.

== Sign language in the brain ==
Neuroscientific research has provided a scientific understanding of how sign language is processed in the brain. There are over 135 discrete sign languages around the world, making use of different accents formed by separate areas of a country.

By utilizing lesion analyses and neuroimaging, neuroscientists have discovered that whether it be spoken or sign language, human brains process language in general in a similar manner regarding which area of the brain is being used.Lesion analyses are used to examine the consequences of damage to specific brain regions involved in language while neuroimaging explores regions that are engaged in the processing of language.

Previous hypotheses have been made that damage to Broca's area or Wernicke's area does not affect sign language being perceived; however, it is not the case. Studies have shown that damage to these areas are similar in results in spoken language where sign errors are present and/or repeated.In both types of languages, they are affected by damage to the left hemisphere of the brain rather than the right -usually dealing with the arts.

There are obvious patterns for utilizing and processing language. Both speaking and signing activate Broca's area, while processing sign language employs Wernicke's area similar to that of spoken language.

There have been other hypotheses about the lateralization of the two hemispheres. Specifically, the right hemisphere was thought to contribute to the overall communication of a language globally whereas the left hemisphere would be dominant in generating the language locally. Through research in aphasias, RHD signers were found to have a problem maintaining the spatial portion of their signs, confusing similar signs at different locations necessary to communicate with another properly. LHD signers, on the other hand, had similar results to those of hearing patients. Furthermore, other studies have emphasized that sign language is present bilaterally but will need to continue researching to reach a conclusion.

== Writing in the brain ==
There is a comparatively small body of research on the neurology of reading and writing. Most of the studies performed deal with reading rather than writing or spelling, and the majority of both kinds focus solely on the English language. English orthography is less transparent than that of other languages using a Latin script. Another difficulty is that some studies focus on spelling words of English and omit the few logographic characters found in the script.

In terms of spelling, English words can be divided into three categories – regular, irregular, and "novel words" or "nonwords." Regular words are those in which there is a regular, one-to-one correspondence between grapheme and phoneme in spelling. Irregular words are those in which no such correspondence exists. Nonwords are those that exhibit the expected orthography of regular words but do not carry meaning, such as nonce words and onomatopoeia.

An issue in the cognitive and neurological study of reading and spelling in English is whether a single-route or dual-route model best describes how literate speakers are able to read and write all three categories of English words according to accepted standards of orthographic correctness. Single-route models posit that lexical memory is used to store all spellings of words for retrieval in a single process. Dual-route models posit that lexical memory is employed to process irregular and high-frequency regular words, while low-frequency regular words and nonwords are processed using a sub-lexical set of phonological rules.

The single-route model for reading has found support in computer modelling studies, which suggest that readers identify words by their orthographic similarities to phonologically alike words. However, cognitive and lesion studies lean towards the dual-route model. Cognitive spelling studies on children and adults suggest that spellers employ phonological rules in spelling regular words and nonwords, while lexical memory is accessed to spell irregular words and high-frequency words of all types. Similarly, lesion studies indicate that lexical memory is used to store irregular words and certain regular words, while phonological rules are used to spell nonwords.

More recently, neuroimaging studies using positron emission tomography and fMRI have suggested a balanced model in which the reading of all word types begins in the visual word form area, but subsequently branches off into different routes depending upon whether or not access to lexical memory or semantic information is needed (which would be expected with irregular words under a dual-route model). A 2007 fMRI study found that subjects asked to produce regular words in a spelling task exhibited greater activation in the left posterior STG, an area used for phonological processing, while the spelling of irregular words produced greater activation of areas used for lexical memory and semantic processing, such as the left IFG and left SMG and both hemispheres of the MTG. Spelling nonwords was found to access members of both pathways, such as the left STG and bilateral MTG and ITG. Significantly, it was found that spelling induces activation in areas such as the left fusiform gyrus and left SMG that are also important in reading, suggesting that a similar pathway is used for both reading and writing.

Far less information exists on the cognition and neurology of non-alphabetic and non-English scripts. Every language has a morphological and a phonological component, either of which can be recorded by a writing system. Scripts recording words and morphemes are considered logographic, while those recording phonological segments, such as syllabaries and alphabets, are phonographic. Most systems combine the two and have both logographic and phonographic characters.

In terms of complexity, writing systems can be characterized as "transparent" or "opaque" and as "shallow" or "deep". A "transparent" system exhibits an obvious correspondence between grapheme and sound, while in an "opaque" system this relationship is less obvious. The terms "shallow" and "deep" refer to the extent that a system's orthography represents morphemes as opposed to phonological segments. Systems that record larger morphosyntactic or phonological segments, such as logographic systems and syllabaries put greater demand on the memory of users. It would thus be expected that an opaque or deep writing system would put greater demand on areas of the brain used for lexical memory than would a system with transparent or shallow orthography.

== See also ==
- Sign language
- Phonology
- Auditory processing disorder
- Brodmann area
- Computational audiology
- Cognitive science
- Developmental verbal dyspraxia
- FOXP2
- Language disorder
- Neurobiology
- Neurolinguistics
- Neuropsychology
- Neuroscience
- Origin of language
- Visual word form area
