= Karen Emmorey =

Professor of speech and language

- Occupation: Distinguished Professor
- Awards: Distinguished Career Award from the Society of the Neurobiology of Language (2020)

Academic background
- Education: University of California, Los Angeles

Karen Denise Emmorey is a linguist and cognitive neuroscientist known for her research on the neuroscience of sign language and what sign languages reveal about the brain and human languages more generally. Emmorey holds the position of Distinguished Professor in the School of Speech, Language, and Hearing Sciences at San Diego State University, where she directs the Laboratory for Language and Cognitive Neuroscience and the Center for Clinical and Cognitive Neuroscience.

== Awards ==
Emmorey received the 2020 Distinguished Career Award from the Society for the Neurobiology of Language.

She was appointed the Albert W. Johnson Research Lecturer for 2013, San Diego State University's highest research honor.

Emmorey is a Fellow of the Linguistic Society of America and a Fellow of the American Association for the Advancement of Science.

== Biography ==
Emmorey completed a B.A. in psychology and linguistics at the University of California, Los Angeles (UCLA) in 1982. She continued her education at UCLA, receiving her Ph.D. in Linguistics in 1987. Her dissertation titled Morphological Structure and Parsing in the Lexicon was supervised by Victoria Fromkin. Emmorey worked with Ursula Belugi as a post doctoral fellow at the Salk Institute for Biological Studies from 1987 to 1988. Emmorey remained at the Salk Institute conducting research and serving as the Associate Director of the Laboratory for Cognitive Neuroscience from 2002 to 2005. Her research during this time focused on the use of physical space in sign language, supported by funding from the National Science Foundation (NSF). Her work has deepened the understanding of language universals and how properties of language vary across auditory-vocal or visual-manual modalities.

Emmorey has been a member of faculty of San Diego State University since 2005. She has received grants from the National Institute on Deafness and Other Communication Disorders (NIDCD) and the NSF to support work on sign language and bilingualism, including a NSF collaborative research grant to study the semantic organization of American Sign Language. She is the author and editor of several books and numerous articles in psychology, linguistics, neuroscience and related fields.

Emmorey was an associate editor of the Journal of Deaf Studies and Deaf Education from 2001 to 2017, and associate editor of Language from 2013 to 2016. She has served on the editorial boards of several scientific journals, including Sign Language Studies, Sign Language & Linguistics, and the Journal of Memory and Language.

== Research ==
Emmorey's research is broadly focused on the neurobiology of language. She studies language processing in the brain among those who use sign language and among those who are bilingual users of a sign language and an oral language. Her research team has found similarities in how the brain processes language regardless of modality while also uncovering differences in neural processing that arise from utilizing different modalities of language. In one of her notable studies, Emmorey and her colleagues documented advantages in visual imagery among sign language users (both hearing and deaf individuals) in the context of detecting mirror image reversals when compared to non-signers. In a study utilizing fMRI, Emmorey's team found similarities in how the brain processes symbolic gestures (pantomime and emblems) and spoken language, suggesting involvement of a left-lateralized cortical network in mapping symbolic gestures or spoken words onto conceptual representations.

Emmorey's research has been integral to the study of bilingualism, especially as it focuses on multiple modalities of bilingualism. She has conducted research on the controversial subject of whether bilinguals have advantages in executive functioning. Emmorey and her colleagues looked at possible cognitive advantages in those who are bilingual in multiple modalities (speaking and signing) and those who are bilingual in the same modality (speaking). They found that bimodal bilinguals performed the same as monolinguals on a set of flanker tasks assessing inhibitory control, whereas unimodal bilinguals were faster than both monolinguals and bimodal bilinguals on the tasks. These findings suggested that the bilingual advantage may be found only in unimodal bilinguals, perhaps as a consequence of their switching between two or more languages in the same modality.

== Books ==
- Emmorey, K. (2002). Language, cognition, and the brain: Insights from sign language research. Lawrence Erlbaum Associates.
- Emmorey, K. (Ed.). (2003). Perspectives on classifier constructions in sign languages. Lawrence Erlbaum Associates.
- Emmorey, K., & Lane, H. L. (Eds.). (2000). The signs of language revisited: An anthology to honor Ursula Bellugi and Edward Klima. Lawrence Erlbaum Associates.
- Emmorey, K., & Reilly, J. S. (Eds.). (1995). Language, gesture, and space. Lawrence Erlbaum Associates.

The 2002 book Language, Cognition, and the Brain: Insights from Sign Language Research by Karen Emmorey provides a broad overview and analysis of current work on language in the brain, especially with regard to research on American Sign Language, Nicaraguan Sign Language, and other signed languages.

The collection Language, Gesture, and Space, edited by Karen Emmorey and Judith Reilly in 1995, addressed a number of issues related to the study of signed languages and gestures, including questions of the boundary between nonverbal communication and the grammar of natural language.
