= Linguistic Diversity in Space and Time =

1992 non-fiction work by Johanna Nichols

- Author: Johanna Nichols
- Language: English
- Subject: Linguistic typology
- Genre: Non-fiction
- Publisher: University of Chicago Press
- Publication date: 1992
- Pages: 374
- LC Class: P143 .N53 1992

Linguistic Diversity in Space and Time is a 1992 book by linguist Johanna Nichols. It is her best-known work, pioneering the use of linguistic typology as a tool for understanding human migrations in prehistory.

Nichols selects a sample of the world's languages (one per stock) and tabulates typological characteristics such as:

- Head-marking vs. dependent-marking
- Morphological complexity
- Word order
- Morphosyntactic alignment
- Valence-changing operations or voice system
- Presence or absence of distinction between inclusive and exclusive we
- Presence or absence of distinction between inalienable possession and alienable possession
- Presence or absence of numerical classifiers
- Presence or absence of noun classes (such as grammatical gender or animacy)
- Presence or absence of grammatical number ("plurality neutralization" is Nichols's term for absence)
- Presence or absence of adpositional phrases ("PP's" in the book, for prepositional or postpositional phrases)
- Presence or absence of non-finite verbs (infinitives or verbal nouns)

for each language, using this data to discover regional patterns in the distribution of these features.

One pattern is spread zones (geographical areas where a language family has spread widely, often repeated with several language families in sequence, like Indo-European and later Turkic languages in central Eurasia) vs. residual zones (areas, often mountainous, where many languages of various families have been preserved, like the Caucasus or New Guinea). For example, head marking is more common in the residual zones, which Nichols suggests is a result of long-term language contact.

At the broadest level, Nichols divides the world of languages into three large regions:

- Old World
- New World (Indigenous languages of the Americas)
- "'Pacific" (Australian languages and Papuan languages)

The Old World is geographically largest, but has the least typological diversity and lowest density of language families, suggesting that repeated spreads from its center have eliminated much diversity which previously existed, especially at the edges of the Afro-Eurasia supercontinent. Surprisingly, typological statistics for African languages are similar to those for the languages of Eurasia, though there has been little spread of languages between the two areas, other than the Afroasiatic languages that span both areas.

The New World differs considerably from the Old World, with much higher frequencies of head-marking, ergativity and other features. The "Pacific" is intermediate on these features. One interpretation is that these patterns resulted from chance; another is that the New World was colonized from a Pacific region which was formerly larger and included unknown archaic languages of coastal East Asia. Based on the latter interpretation, Nichols suggests a relatively early date (pre-Clovis) for the initial peopling of the Americas.

Nichols also suggests that change over time in head-marking languages tends to destroy the information needed for the comparative method of reconstructing a protolanguage that is the ancestor to a number of known languages, while dependent-marking languages are more likely to preserve it over time. This would help account for the large number of language families in the Americas and Australasia that are still considered independent, in contrast to the large families of considerable time depth that have been reconstructed in Eurasia and Africa.
