= Linguistic typology =

Branch of linguistics

Linguistic typology (or language typology) is a field of linguistics that studies and classifies languages according to their structural features to allow their comparison. Its aim is to describe and explain the structural diversity and the common properties of the world's languages. Its subdisciplines include, but are not limited to: phonological typology, which deals with sound features; syntactic typology, which deals with word order and form; lexical typology, which deals with language vocabulary; and theoretical typology, which aims to explain the universal tendencies.

Linguistic typology is contrasted with genealogical linguistics on the grounds that typology groups languages or their grammatical features based on formal similarities rather than historic descendence. The issue of genealogical relation is however relevant to typology because modern data sets aim to be representative and unbiased. Samples are collected evenly from different language families and emphasize the importance of lesser-known languages in gaining insight into human language.

== History ==
Speculations of the existence of a (logical) general or universal grammar underlying all languages were published in the Middle Ages, especially by the Modistae school. At the time, Latin was the model language of linguistics although transcribing Irish and Icelandic into the Latin alphabet was found to be problematic. The cross-linguistic dimension of linguistics was established during the Renaissance. For example, Grammaticae quadrilinguis partitiones (1544) by Johannes Drosaeus compared French and the three "holy languages:" Hebrew, Greek, and Latin. The approach was expanded by the Port-Royal Grammar (1660) of Antoine Arnauld and Claude Lancelot, who added Spanish, Italian, German, and Arabic. Nicolas Beauzée's 1767 book includes examples of English, Swedish, Lappish, Irish, Welsh, Basque, Quechua, and Chinese.

The conquest and the conversion of the world by Europe gave rise to "missionary linguistics," which produced first-hand word lists and grammatical descriptions of exotic languages. That work is accounted for in the "Catalogue of the Languages of the Populations We Know" (1800) by the Spanish Jesuit Lorenzo Hervás. Johann Christoph Adelung collected the first large language sample with the Lord's Prayer in almost 500 languages (posthumous, 1817).

More developed 19th-century comparative works include Franz Bopp's 'Conjugation System' (1816) and Wilhelm von Humboldt's "On the Difference in Human Linguistic Structure and Its Influence on the Intellectual Development of Mankind" (posthumous, 1836). In 1818, August Wilhelm Schlegel made a classification of the world's languages that had three types: (i) languages lacking grammatical structure like Chinese; (ii) agglutinative languages like Turkish; and (iii) inflectional languages, which can be synthetic like Latin and Ancient Greek, or analytic like French. The idea was later developed by others including August Schleicher, Heymann Steinthal, Franz Misteli, Franz Nicolaus Finck, and Max Müller.

The word "typology" was proposed by Georg von der Gabelentz in his Sprachwissenschaft (1891). Louis Hjelmslev proposed typology as a large-scale empirical-analytical endeavor of comparing grammatical features to uncover the essence of language. Such a project began from the 1961 conference on language universals at Dobbs Ferry. Speakers included Roman Jakobson, Charles F. Hockett, and Joseph Greenberg, who proposed 45 different types of linguistic universals, based on his data sets from 30 languages. Greenberg's findings were mostly known from the 19th-century grammarians, but his systematic presentation of them would serve as a model for modern typology. Winfred P. Lehmann introduced Greenbergian typological theory to Indo-European studies in the 1970s.

During the 20th century, typology based on missionary linguistics became centered on SIL International, which today hosts its catalogue of living languages, Ethnologue, as an online database. The Greenbergian, or universalist, approach is accounted for by the World Atlas of Language Structures, among others. Typology is also done within the frameworks of functional grammar including functional discourse grammar, role and reference grammar, and systemic functional linguistics. During the early years of the 21st century, however, the existence of linguistic universals became questioned by linguists proposing evolutionary typology.

== Method ==
Quantitative typology deals with the distribution and the co-occurrence of structural patterns in the languages of the world. Major types of non-chance distribution include:

- preferences (for instance, absolute and implicational universals, semantic maps, and hierarchies)
- correlations (for instance, areal patterns, such as with a Sprachbund)

Linguistic universals are patterns that can be seen cross-linguistically. Universals can either be absolute, meaning that every documented language exhibits the characteristic, or statistical, meaning that the characteristic is either seen in most languages or probable in most languages. Universals, both absolute and statistical, can be unrestricted, meaning that they apply to most or all languages without any additional conditions. Conversely, both absolute and statistical universals can be restricted or implicational, meaning that a characteristic is true on the condition of something else (if Y characteristic is true, then X characteristic is true). An example of an implicational hierarchy is that dual pronouns are found only in languages with plural pronouns, and singular pronouns (or those unspecified in terms of number) are found in all languages. The implicational hierarchy is thus singular < plural < dual (etc.).

Qualitative typology develops cross-linguistically viable notions or types that provide a framework for the description and comparison of languages.

== Subfields ==
The main subfields of linguistic typology include the empirical fields of syntactic, phonological and lexical typology. Additionally, theoretical typology aims to explain the empirical findings, especially statistical tendencies or implicational hierarchies.

=== Syntactic typology ===
Syntactic typology studies a vast array of grammatical phenomena from the languages of the world. Two well-known issues include dominant order and left-right symmetry.

==== Dominant order ====
One set of types reflects the basic order of subject, verb, and direct object in sentences:

- Object–subject–verb (OSV)
- Object–verb–subject (OVS)
- Subject–verb–object (SVO)
- Subject–object–verb (SOV)
- Verb–subject–object (VSO)
- Verb–object–subject (VOS)

Those labels usually appear abbreviated as "SVO" and so forth and may be called "typologies" of the languages to which they apply. The most common word orders are SOV and SVO, and the least common orders are VOS and OVS, the latter having only four attested instances.

In the 1980s, linguists began to question the relevance of geographical distribution of different values for various features of linguistic structure. They may have wanted to discover whether a particular grammatical structure that is found in one language would be likewise found in another language in the same geographic location. Some languages split verbs into an auxiliary and an infinitive or participle and put the subject and/or object between them. For instance, German (Ich habe einen Fuchs im Wald gesehen - *"I have a fox in-the woods seen"), Dutch (Hans vermoedde dat Jan Marie zag leren zwemmen - *"Hans suspected that Jan Marie saw to learn to swim") and Welsh (Mae'r gwirio sillafu wedi'i gwblhau - *"Is the checking spelling after its to complete"). In that case, linguists base the typology on the non-analytic tenses (the sentences in which the verb is not split) or on the position of the auxiliary. German is thus SVO in main clauses, and Welsh is VSO (and preposition phrases would go after the infinitive).

Many typologists classify both German and Dutch as V2 languages, as the verb invariantly occurs as the second element of a full clause.

Some languages allow varying degrees of freedom in their constituent order, which poses a problem for their classification within the subject–verb–object schema. Languages with bound case markings for nouns, for example, tend to have more flexible word orders than languages whose case is defined by position within a sentence or presence of a preposition. For example, in some languages with bound case markings for nouns, such as Language X, varying degrees of freedom in constituent order are observed. Such languages exhibit more flexible word orders, allowing for variations like SVO word order, as in "The cat ate the mouse," and OSV word order, as in "The mouse the cat ate." In such a case, to define a basic constituent order type, one generally looks at the frequency of different types in declarative affirmative main clauses in pragmatically neutral contexts, preferably with only old referents. Thus, for instance, Russian is widely considered an SVO language, which is the most frequent constituent order under such conditions, but all sorts of variations are possible and occur in texts. In many inflected languages, such as Russian, Latin, and Greek, departures from the default word orders are permissible but usually imply a shift in focus, an emphasis on the final element, or some special context. In the poetry of these languages, the word order may also shift freely to meet metrical demands. Additionally, freedom of word order may vary within the same language, such as formal, literary, or archaizing varieties, may have different, stricter, or more lenient constituent-order structures than an informal spoken variety of the same language.

On the other hand, if there is no clear preference under the described conditions, the language is considered to have "flexible constituent order" (a type unto itself).

An additional problem is that in languages without living speech communities, such as Latin, Ancient Greek, and Old Church Slavonic, linguists have only written evidence, which was perhaps written in a poetic, formalizing, or archaic style that mischaracterizes the actual daily use of the language. The daily spoken language of Sophocles or Cicero might have exhibited a syntax that was different or much more regular than their written legacy indicates.

===== Theoretical issues =====
The below table indicates the distribution of the dominant word order patterns of over 5,000 individual languages and 366 language families. SOV is the most common type in both of them although that is much clearer in the data of language families, including isolates. "NODOM" represents languages without a single dominant order.

Type	Languages	%	Families	%
SOV	2,275	43.3%	239	65.3%
SVO	2,117	40.3%	55	15%
VSO	503	9.5%	27	7.4%
VOS	174	3.3%	15	4.1%
NODOM	124	2.3%	26	7.1%
OVS	40	0.7%	3	0.8%
OSV	19	0.3%	1	0.3%

Though the reason of dominance is sometimes considered an unsolved or unsolvable typological problem, several explanations for the distribution pattern have been proposed. Evolutionary explanations include those by Thomas Givon (1979), who suggests that all languages stem from an SOV language but are evolving into different kinds, and by Derek Bickerton (1981), who argues that the original language was SVO, which supports simpler grammar employing word order, instead of case markers to differentiate between clausal roles.

Universalist explanations include a model by Russell Tomlin (1986) based on three functional principles: (i) animate before inanimate, (ii) theme before commentm, and (iii) verb-object bonding. The three-way model roughly predicts the real hierarchy (see table above) assuming no statistical difference between SOV and SVO, and no statistical difference between VOS and OVS. By contrast, the processing efficiency theory of John A. Hawkins (1994) suggests that constituents are ordered from shortest to longest in VO languages and from longest to shortest in OV languages, which give rise to the attested distribution. His approach relies on the notion that OV languages have heavy subjects, and VO languages have heavy objects, which is disputed.

==== Left-right symmetry ====
A second major way of syntactic categorization is by excluding the subject from consideration. It is a well-documented typological feature that languages with a dominant OV order (object before verb), Japanese for example, tend to have postpositions. In contrast, VO languages (verb before object) like English tend to have prepositions as their main type of adpositions. Several OV/VO correlations have been uncovered.

Correlation	VO languages	Example (VO)	OV languages	Example (OV)
Adposition type	prepositions	of..., than..., on...	postpositions	...of, ...than, ...on
Order of noun and genitive	noun before genitive	father + of John	genitive before noun	John-of + father
Order of adjective and standard of comparison	adjective before standard	taller + than Bob	standard before adjective	Bob-than + taller
Order of verb and adpositional phrase	verb before adpositional phrase	slept + on the floor	adpositional phrase before verb	floor-on + slept
Order of verb and manner adverb	verb before manner adverb	ran + slowly	manner adverb before verb	slowly + ran
Order of copula and predicative	copula before predicate	is + a teacher	predicate before copula	a teacher + is
Order of auxiliary verb and content verb	auxiliary before content verb	want + to see Mary	content verb before auxiliary	Mary see-to + want
Place of adverbial subordinator in clause	clause-initial subordinators	because + Bob has left	clause-final subordinators	Bob has left-because
Order of noun and relative clause	noun before relative clause	movies + that we saw	either	we-seen + movies or movies we-seen

===== Theoretical issues =====
Several processing explanations were proposed in the 1980s and the 1990s for the above correlations. They suggest that the brain finds it easier to parse syntactic patterns that are either right- or left-branching but not when it is mixed. The most widely-held such explanation is John A. Hawkins's parsing efficiency theory, which argues that language is a non-innate adaptation to innate cognitive mechanisms. Typological tendencies are considered as being based on language users' preference for grammars that are organized efficiently and on their avoidance of word orderings that cause processing difficulty. Hawkins's processing theory predicts the above table but also makes predictions for non-correlation pairs, including the order of adjective, demonstrative and numeral in respect with the noun. The theory was based on corpus research and lacks support in psycholinguistic studies.

Some languages exhibit regular "inefficient" patterning, which include the VO languages Chinese, which has the adpositional phrase before the verb, and Finnish, which has postpositions. However, there are few other profoundly exceptional languages. It is suggested more recently that the left-right orientation is limited to role-marking connectives (adpositions and subordinators), stemming directly from the semantic mapping of the sentence. Since the true correlation pairs in the above table either involve such a connective or, arguably, follow from the canonical order, orientation predicts them without making problematic claims.

==== Morphosyntactic alignment ====
Another common classification distinguishes nominative–accusative and ergative–absolutive alignment patterns. In a language with grammatical cases, the classification depends on whether the subject (S) of an intransitive verb has the same case as the agent (A) or the patient (P) of a transitive verb. If a language has no cases but has as its word order AVP or PVA, a classification may reflect whether the subject of an intransitive verb appears on the same side as the agent or the patient of the transitive verb. Bickel (2011) has argued that alignment should be seen as a construction-specific property, rather than a language-specific property.

Many languages show mixed accusative and ergative behaviour (such as ergative morphology marking the verb arguments on top of an accusative syntax). Other languages, called "active languages," have two types of intransitive verbs; some of them ("active verbs") join the subject in the same case as the agent of a transitive verb, and the rest ("stative verbs") join the subject in the same case as the patient. Still other languages behave ergatively only in some contexts (the "split ergativity" is often based on the grammatical person of the arguments or on the tense/aspect of the verb). For example, only some verbs in Georgian behave that way and, as a rule, do so only in the perfective aspect.

=== Phonological typology ===
Linguistic typology also seeks to identify patterns in the structure and distribution of sound systems among the world's languages. That is accomplished by surveying and analyzing the relative frequencies of different phonological properties. Sample relative frequencies are given below for certain speech sounds formed by obstructing airflow (obstruents). The relative frequencies show that contrastive voice commonly occurs with plosives, such as the English "neat" and "need," but occurs much more rarely among fricatives, such as the English "niece" and "knees."

According to a worldwide sample of 637 languages, 62% of them contrast voicing in stops but only 35% do so in fricatives. In the vast majority of those cases, the absence of voicing contrast occurs because there is a lack of voiced fricatives and because all languages have some form of plosive (occlusive), but some languages have no fricatives. This chart shows the breakdown of voicing properties among languages in the aforementioned sample:

Fricative Voicing Plosive Voicing	Yes	No	Total
Yes	117	218	395 (62%)
No	44	198	242 (38%)
Total	221 (35%)	416 (65%)	637

Languages worldwide also vary in the number of sounds that they use. Languages can have very small phonemic inventories (Rotokas, with six consonants and five vowels), or very large inventories (!Xóõ, with 128 consonants and 28 vowels). An interesting phonological observation that was found by the data is that the larger the consonant inventory of a language, the more likely it has a sound from a defined set of complex consonants (clicks, glottalized consonants, doubly articulated labial-velar stops, lateral fricatives and affricates, uvular and pharyngeal consonants, and dental or alveolar non-sibilant fricatives). Of that list, only about 38% of languages in a survey of over 600 with small inventories (less than 19 consonants) contain a member of the set, and 32% of average languages (19-25) contain at least one member and 38% of large consonant inventories (more than 25 consonants) contain a member of this set. It is then seen that complex consonants are in proportion to the size of the inventory.

Vowels contain a more modest number of phonemes, with the average being 5–6, which 51% of the languages in the survey have. About a third of the languages have larger than average vowel inventories. More interesting, though, is the lack of relationship between consonant inventory size and vowel inventory size. Here is a chart showing the lack of predictability between consonant and vowel inventory sizes in relation to each other:

Vowel Quality Inventory Consonant Inventory	Small	Average	Large	Total
Small	47	153	65	265 (39%)
Average	34	105	98	237 (35%)
Large	34	87	57	178 (26%)
Total	115 (17%)	345 (51%)	220 (32%)	680

== See also ==
- Grammaticalization

== Sources ==
- Bisang, W. (2001). Aspects of typology and universals. Berlin: Akademie Verlag. ISBN 3-050-03559-5.
- Comrie, B. (1989). Language universals and linguistic typology: Syntax and morphology. Oxford: Blackwell, 2nd edn. ISBN 0-226-11433-3.
- Croft, W. (2002). Typology and universals. Cambridge: Cambridge UP. 2nd ed. ISBN 0-521-00499-3.
- Cysouw, Michael (2005). "Gebiete und Phänomene: Typologie". In Köhler, Reinhard; Altmann, Gabriel; Piotrowski, Rajmund G. (eds.). Quantitative Linguistik. pp. 554–578. doi:10.1515/9783110155785. ISBN 978-3-11-015578-5.
- Grijzenhout, Janet; Kabak, Baris, eds. (2009). Phonological Domains. doi:10.1515/9783110217100. ISBN 978-3-11-020540-4.
- Moravcsik, Edith A. (2013). Introducing language typology. Cambridge: Cambridge University Press.
- Nichols, J. (1992). Linguistic diversity in space and time. Chicago: University of Chicago Press. ISBN 0-226-58057-1.
- Nichols, Johanna (2007). "What, if anything, is typology?". Linguistic Typology. 11. doi:10.1515/LINGTY.2007.017.
- Song, J.J. (2001). Linguistic typology: Morphology and syntax. Harlow and London: Pearson Education (Longman). ISBN 0-582-31220-5.
- Song, J.J. (ed.) (2011). The Oxford Handbook of Linguistic Typology. Oxford: Oxford University Press. ISBN 978-0-19-928125-1.
- Whaley, L.J. (1997). Introduction to typology: The unity and diversity of language. Newbury Park: Sage. ISBN 0-8039-5963-X.
