= Sign language in the brain =

Sign language refers to any natural language which uses visual gestures produced by the hands and body language to express meaning. The brain's left side is the dominant side utilized for producing and understanding sign language, just as it is for speech. In 1861, Paul Broca studied patients with the ability to understand spoken languages but the inability to produce them. The damaged area was named Broca's area, and located in the left hemisphere’s inferior frontal gyrus (Brodmann areas 44, 45). Soon after, in 1874, Carl Wernicke studied patients with the reverse deficits: patients could produce spoken language, but could not comprehend it. The damaged area was named Wernicke's area, and is located in the left hemisphere’s posterior superior temporal gyrus (Brodmann area 22).

Signers with damage in Broca's area have problems producing signs. Those with damage in the Wernicke's area (left hemisphere) in the temporal lobe of the brain have problems comprehending signed languages. Early on, it was noted that Broca’s area was near the part of the motor cortex controlling the face and mouth. Likewise, Wernicke's area was near the auditory cortex. These motor and auditory areas are important in spoken language processing and production, but the connection to signed languages had yet to be uncovered. For this reason, the left hemisphere was described as the verbal hemisphere, with the right hemisphere deemed to be responsible for spatial tasks. This criterion and classification was used to denounce signed languages as not equal to spoken language until it was widely agreed upon that due to the similarities in cortical connectivity they are linguistically and cognitively equivalent.

In the 1980s research on deaf patients with left hemisphere stroke were examined to explore the brains connection with signed languages. The left perisylvian region was discovered to be functionally critical for language, spoken and signed. Its location near several key auditory processing regions led to the belief that language processing required auditory input and was used to discredit signed languages as "real languages." This research opened the doorway for linguistic analysis and further research on signed languages. Signed languages, like spoken languages, are highly structured linguistic systems; they have their own sets of phonological, morphological and syntactic characteristics. Despite some differences between spoken and signed languages, the associated brain areas share a lot in common.

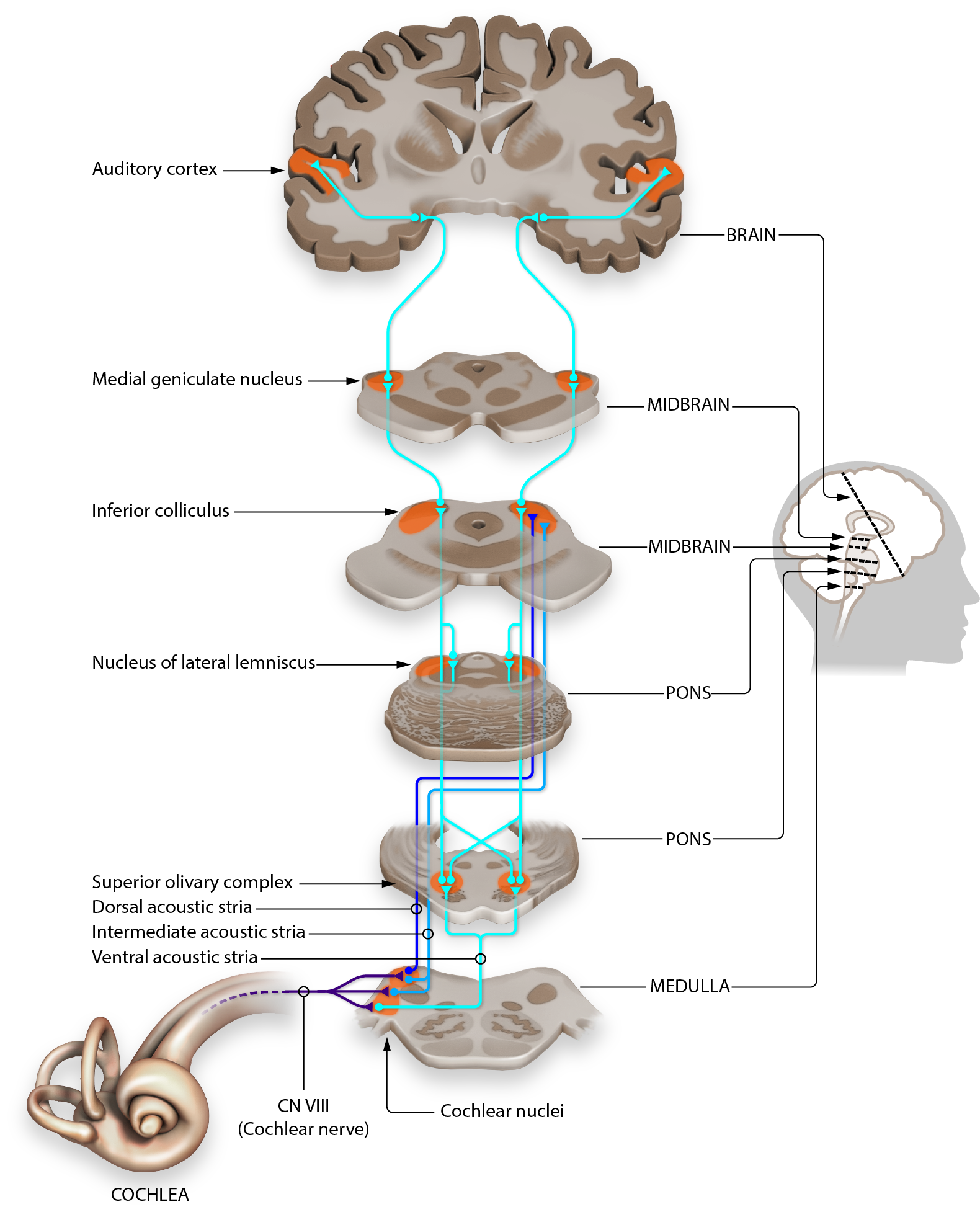
Figure 1. Schematic of the ascending auditory pathway

== How the brain processes auditory information ==
One main structure for hearing is the cochlea, a tiny coiled structure within the ear (shown in Figure 2). This is one of several structures that can be damaged to cause hearing loss. When sound waves enter the ear, they cause a vibration of the eardrum. This vibration causes the ossicles of the ear to move, causing a depression of the oval window. This depression causes waves in the fluid of the cochlea which initiates movement of the basilar membrane. Different sections of the basilar membrane are responsible for responding to different types of sound, with that specific sound’s wave reaching a peak at the responsible part of the basilar membrane. This process is what transforms the sound into neural activity via hair cell receptors. These receptors have stereocilia that cause a release of neurotransmitter onto the vestibulocochlear nerve when moved.

The vestibulocochlear nerve synapses in superior medulla using cochlear nuclei. This is considered the beginning of the ascending auditory pathway (shown in Figure 1). The cochlear nuclei then send information to the superior olivary nucleus to initiate the brain’s process of interpreting and combining information. The brain is able to localize sound by understanding the differences in sounds’ timing and intensities in each ear. This information continues on to the inferior colliculus, which is important for the integration of a majority of ascending auditory information. The inferior colliculus sends this information to the medial geniculate nucleus within the thalamus. The thalamus finally projects the information received to the auditory cortex, which is housed in the temporal lobe.

Figure 2. Schematic of the ear and internal structures

== Hemispheric similarities and differences between spoken and signed languages ==
Both the left and right hemisphere have brain structures associated with spoken and signed languages. Spoken and signed languages both depend on the same cortical substrate. This shows that the left hemisphere is responsible for processing all facets of language, not just speech. The neural organization underlying sign language abilities, however, has more in common with that of spoken language than it does with the neural organization underlying visuospatial processing, which is processed dominantly in the right hemisphere. Those patients with left hemisphere damage (LHD), in areas ranging from the frontal lobe to the occipital lobe, exhibited both Broca’s and Wernicke’s aphasia symptoms. Patients performed poorly on many language-based tasks such as comprehending signs and sentences and fluently signing. Similar to hearing patients’ “slips of the tongue” after LHD, deaf LHD patients experienced paraphasias, or “slips of the hand.” These slips of the hand usually involve an incorrect hand shape in the correct location and with the correct movement, similar to a hearing patient substituting “bline” or “gine” for “fine.” Some right hemisphere damage does lead to disruptions in sign languages, however. The topographical use of signing space is often imprecise in patients with RHD; the relation between the location of hands in signing space and the location of objects in physical space is often impaired. Rather than being misunderstood, however, subjects and objects in a sentence may simply be placed incorrectly relative to the other subjects and objects in a sentence, like saying “the pencil is in the book” rather than, “the pencil is on top of the book.” Around the time of the experiment, theories began to float around the community that there may be an unexplained involvement of the right hemisphere in signed languages not seen in spoken languages. These theories were also adopted by signed language linguists and further imaging studies and neuropsychological testing confirmed the presence of activity in the right hemisphere. Prior right hemisphere studies on spoken languages has led to prevailing theories in its role in discourse cohesion and prosody. The right hemisphere has been proposed to assist in detection, processing and discrimination of visual movement. The right hemisphere has also been shown to play a role in the perception of body movements and positions. All of these right hemisphere features are more prominent for signed languages than spoken languages, hence the argument that signed languages engage the right hemisphere more than spoken languages.

As brain imaging technology such as EEG became more developed and commonplace, it was eventually applied to sign language comprehension. Using EEG to record event-related potentials can correlate specific brain activity to language processing in real time. Previous application of ERP on hearing patients showed neural activity in the left hemisphere related to syntactic errors. When electrodes are hooked up to deaf native signers, similar syntactic anomalies associated with an event-related potential were recorded across both left and right hemisphere. This shows that syntactic processing for American Sign Language (ASL) is not lateralized to the left hemisphere.

When communicating in their respective languages, similar brain regions are activated for both deaf and hearing subjects with a few exceptions. During the processing of auditory stimuli for spoken languages there is detectable activity within Broca's Area, Wernicke's Area, the angular gyrus, dorsolateral prefrontal cortex, and superior temporal sulcus. Right hemisphere activity was detectable in less than 50% of trials for hearing subjects reciting English sentences. When deaf subjects were tasked with reading English, none of the left hemisphere structures seen with hearing subjects were visible. Deaf subjects also displayed obvious middle and posterior temporal-parietal activation within the right hemisphere. When hearing subjects were presented various signs designed to evoke emotion within native signers, there was no clear changes in brain activity in traditional language processing centers. Brain activity of deaf native signers when processing signs was similar to activity of hearing subjects processing English. However, processing of ASL extensively recruited right hemisphere structures including significant activation of the entire superior temporal lobe, the angular region, and inferior prefrontal cortex. Since native hearing signers also exhibited this right hemisphere activation when processing ASL, it has been proposed that this right hemisphere activation is due to the temporal visuospatial decoding necessary to process signed languages.

In a similar study published in 2017, deaf individuals who use French Sign Language were studied during processing French Sign Language and written French. During the processes of each of the languages, there was bilateral activation in the occipital lobes, in the temporal lobes near the superior temporal sulcus, and in the frontal gyri. The processing of sign language showed stronger activation in both occipital lobes, both posterior temporal lobes, and in the thalamus bilaterally. It also showed strong activation particularly in structures in the right hemisphere: the superior temporal sulcus, the fusiform gyrus, and the inferior frontal gyrus. Opposed to processing sign language, when the individuals processed written French there was strong activation bilaterally and in the left hemisphere. The areas that showed bilateral activation were the inferior parietal lobes, fusiform gyri, and Brodmann Area 44, among others. The areas lateralized to the left hemisphere were the calcarine and fusiform gyrus, specifically at the location for visual word form.

== Neurological differences between deaf and hearing groups ==
It is thought that there are significant neuroanatomical differences among congenitally deaf humans versus those who become deaf later in life. Therefore, it is widely thought that research into the differences in connections and projections of neurons in deaf humans must block into two groups—congenitally deaf and deaf after birth. Structural brain imaging has commonly shown white matter volume of the auditory cortices differs between deaf and hearing subjects, regardless of the first language learned. Deaf humans are thought to have a larger ratio of gray matter to white matter in certain auditory cortices, such as left and right Heschl's gyrus and Superior Temporal gyrus. This heightened ratio is thought to exist due to less overall white matter in Heschl's gyrus and the Superior Temoral gyrus among deaf humans. Overall, the auditory cortices of deaf humans have an increased gray-white matter ratio as a result of the lack of auditory stimuli which is commonly thought to lead to less myelination and fewer projections to and from the auditory cortices.

It has been thought that congenitally deaf people could provide insight into brain plasticity; the decreased auditory connectivity and brain volume for auditory processing provides an opportunity for enhancement in the visual cortices which are of greater importance to deaf humans. The Calcarine sulcus acts as the hub for the Primary Visual Cortex in humans. Congenitally deaf humans have measurably higher volume of Calcarine cortex than hearing humans. The increased volume and size of visual cortices of deaf individuals can lead to heightened visual processing. Deaf humans have demonstrated, via event-related potential, an increased sensitivity and reactivity to new visual stimuli—evidence of brain plasticity leading to behavioral enhancement.

== Differences between signers and non-signers ==
In one experiment published in 1992, visual mental imagery was studied in ASL signers—deaf and hearing—and hearing non-signers. These hearing signers were born to deaf parents, and ASL was their first language. Another aspect looked at in this study was the difference between native signers and those who learned sign language at a later age. In this experiment, native signers are considered deaf individuals who were born to deaf parents and therefore started absorbing the language in infancy. The other deaf signers' primary language is sign language, but they did not learn it until between the ages of two and sixteen.

In the experiment of generating simple and complex images, deaf individuals were the quickest, followed by hearing signers and then hearing non-signers. This was expected; however, looking at a chart of the results, the hearing signers performed almost identically, in regards to the simple and complex images, to the deaf signers but just more slowly. The hearing non-signers were right on track in following behind on the simple image, but their reaction time was vastly longer. At least in this area, experience with a visual-spatial language provides quicker reaction times.

The results are consistent with abilities recruited for processing sign language being enhanced in the brain, compared to those abilities in non-signers. A couple of things the subjects were tested on were mental rotation and mirror reversals. Signers had an advantage in mirror reversals, but there was no difference between signers and non-signers performing mental rotation. Because of these results, it may not be true to say that signers have a better ability to transform images, but the ability may be in rotating images. Because of this experiment, the cause of enhanced abilities was questioned to be because of auditory deprivation or because of using a visual-spatial language. Hearing signers who learned sign language as a first language may be the key to answering this question.

== Beneficial uses of sign language ==
While sign language is mostly used by people who are deaf, hard of hearing, or in close relationships with people that are deaf or hard of hearing, sign language can be beneficial for other conditions that cause difficulties with communicating using verbal language. These disorders can include issues with articulation, fluency, and voice.

Apraxia of speech

This is a disorder that affects the brain's ability to plan the movements involved in speech. In this disorder, the person cognitively knows what they want to say but is not able to produce that thought verbally. Apraxia of speech can be either acquired or present from birth. Acquired apraxia is due to damage in parts of the brain that are used for speech production, and the causes of apraxia from birth are not clear.

Some symptoms of apraxia are:

- Distortion of sounds (such as vowels)
- Inconsistent errors in speech
- Errors in tone, stress, or rhythm

Dysarthria

This is a disorder that is a result of either weakness in the muscles that are used for speech production or there is a decrease in the ability to control those muscles. Some common causes of dysarthria are nervous system disorders or other disorders that can cause paralysis in the face, tongue, and throat.

Some symptoms of dysarthria are:

- Slurred or slow speech
- Inappropriate volume
- Rapid speech
- Abnormal speech rhythm
- Monotone speech
- Difficulty moving tongue or muscles in the face

Aphasia

This is a disorder that impacts the way a person comprehends, speaks, and writes language. Aphasia usually is a result of traumatic head injury or stroke, but can have other causes such as tumors or progressive diseases. There are several types of aphasia, with the two most popular being Broca’s Aphasia and Wernicke’s Aphasia. The different types of aphasia all have different impacts on the comprehension and production of language.

Some symptoms of aphasia are:

- Short or incomplete sentences
- Incorrect substitutions of words
- Unrecognizable words
- Difficulty finding words
- Not understanding what is being read

Dysphonia

This is a disorder of the voice and includes two different types. Hypofunctional dysphonia is due to closure of vocal cords or vocal folds being incomplete, whereas hyperfunctional dysphonia is due to overuse of laryngeal muscles.

Some symptoms of dysphonia are:

- Breathy, hoarse or rough voice
- Voice instability
- Voice fatigue
