= Johanna Nichols =

American linguist (born 1945)

- Born: 1945 (age 80–81); Iowa City, Iowa
- Occupation: Linguist

Academic work
- Main interests: Slavic languages, Northeast Caucasian languages, historical linguistics
- Notable works: Linguistic Diversity in Space and Time

Johanna Nichols (born 1945, Iowa City, Iowa) is an American linguist and professor emerita in the Department of Slavic Languages and Literatures at the University of California, Berkeley.

== Career ==
She earned her Ph.D. in Linguistics at the University of California, Berkeley, in 1973 with a dissertation titled "The Balto-Slavic predicate instrumental: a problem in diachronic syntax".

Her research interests include the Slavic languages, the linguistic prehistory of northern Eurasia, language typology, ancient linguistic prehistory, and languages of the Caucasus, chiefly Chechen and Ingush. She has made fundamental contributions to these fields.

== Honors ==
A festschrift in her honor, Language Typology and Historical Contingency: In honor of Johanna Nichols, was published in 2013.

Nichols's best known work, Linguistic Diversity in Space and Time, won the Linguistic Society of America's Leonard Bloomfield Book Award for 1994.

In 2013 Nichols was inducted as a Fellow of the Linguistic Society of America. In 2023 she was elected as a member of the Academia Europaea.

== Books ==
- Predicate Nominals: A Partial Surface Syntax of Russian. Berkeley: University of California Press, 1981. ISBN 0-520-09626-6.
- Grammar Inside and Outside the Clause: Some Approaches to Theory from the Field. Edited by Johanna Nichols and Anthony C. Woodbury. Cambridge [Cambridgeshire]; New York: Cambridge University Press, 1985. ISBN 0-521-26617-3.
- Evidentiality: The Linguistic Coding of Epistemology. Edited by Wallace Chafe and Johanna Nichols. Norwood, N.J.: Ablex Pub. Corp., 1986. ISBN 0-89391-203-4
- Linguistic Diversity in Space and Time. Chicago: University of Chicago Press, 1992. ISBN 0-226-58056-3.
- Sound Symbolism. Edited by Leanne Hinton, Johanna Nichols, and John J. Ohala. Cambridge [England]; New York, NY: Cambridge University Press, 1994. ISBN 0-521-45219-8.
- Chechen–English and English–Chechen Dictionary / Noxchiin–ingals, ingals–noxchiin deshnizhaina. London; New York: Routledge Curzon, 2004. ISBN 978-0-203-56517-9. Johanna Nichols, Ronald L. Sprouse, and Arbi Vagapov.
- Ingush Grammar. Berkeley: University of California Press, 2010. ISBN 0-520-09877-3.
