= John A. Hawkins (linguist) =

Linguist

John A. Hawkins is Professor of English and Applied Linguistics at the Research Centre for English and Applied Linguistics (RCEAL) at the University of Cambridge. As of 2007 he is also a professor in the Department of Linguistics at UC Davis.

His main research interests are in English grammar, psycholinguistics, language universals, linguistic typology and historical linguistics.

== Selected publications ==
- Definiteness and Indefiniteness (1978, Humanities Press & Croom Helm; 2015, Routledge)
- Word Order Universals (1983, Academic Press)
- A Comparative Typology of English and German (1986, University of Texas Press; 2015, Routledge)
- [Editor] Explaining Language Universals (1988, Basil Blackwell)
- A Performance Theory of Order and Constituency (1994, Cambridge University Press)
- Efficiency and Complexity in Grammars (2004, Oxford University Press)
- Cross-linguistic Variation and Efficiency (2014, Oxford University Press)
