= Implicational hierarchy =

Implicational hierarchy, in linguistics, is a chain of implicational universals. A set of chained universals is schematically shown as in (1):

(1) A < B < C < D

It can be reformulated in the following way: If a language has property D, then it also has properties A, B, and C; if a language has a property C, then it also has properties A and B, etc. In other words, the implicational hierarchy defines the possible combinations of properties A, B, C, and D as listed in matrix (2):

	A	B	C	D
Type 1:	+	+	+	+
Type 2:	+	+	+	-
Type 3:	+	+	-	-
Type 4:	+	-	-	-
Type 5:	-	-	-	-

Implicational hierarchies are a useful tool in capturing linguistic generalizations pertaining the different components of the language. They are found in all subfields of grammar.

== Phonology ==
(3) is an example of an implicational hierarchy concerning the distribution of nasal phonemes across languages, which concerns dental/alveolar, bilabial, and palatal voiced nasals, respectively:

(3) /n/ < /m/ < /ɲ/

This hierarchy defines the following possible combinations of dental/alveolar, bilabial, and palatal voiced nasals in the phoneme inventory of a language:

(4)

	/n/	/m/	/ɲ/
Type 1:	/n/	/m/	/ɲ/
Type 2:	/n/	/m/	-
Type 3:	/n/	-	-

In other words, the hierarchy implies that there are no languages with /ɲ/ but without /m/ and /n/, or with /ɲ/ and /m/ but without /n/.

== Morphology ==
Number marking provides an example of implicational hierarchies in morphology.

(5) Number: singular < plural < dual < trial / paucal

On the one hand, the hierarchy implies that no language distinguishes a trial unless having a dual, and no language has dual without a plural. On the other hand, the hierarchy provides implications for the morphological marking: if the plural is coded with a certain number of morphemes, then the dual is coded with at least as many morphemes.

== Syntax ==
Implicational hierarchies also play a role in syntactic phenomena. For instance, in some languages (e.g. Tangut) the transitive verb agrees not with a subject, or the object, but with the syntactic argument which is higher on the person hierarchy.

(5) Person: first < second < third

See also: animacy.

== Bibliography ==
- Comrie, B. (1989). Language universals and linguistic typology: Syntax and morphology. Oxford: Blackwell, 2nd edn.
- Croft, W. (1990). Typology and universals. Cambridge: Cambridge UP.
- Whaley, L.J. (1997). Introduction to typology: The unity and diversity of language. Newbury Park: Sage.
