= Visual word form area =

Region of the brain

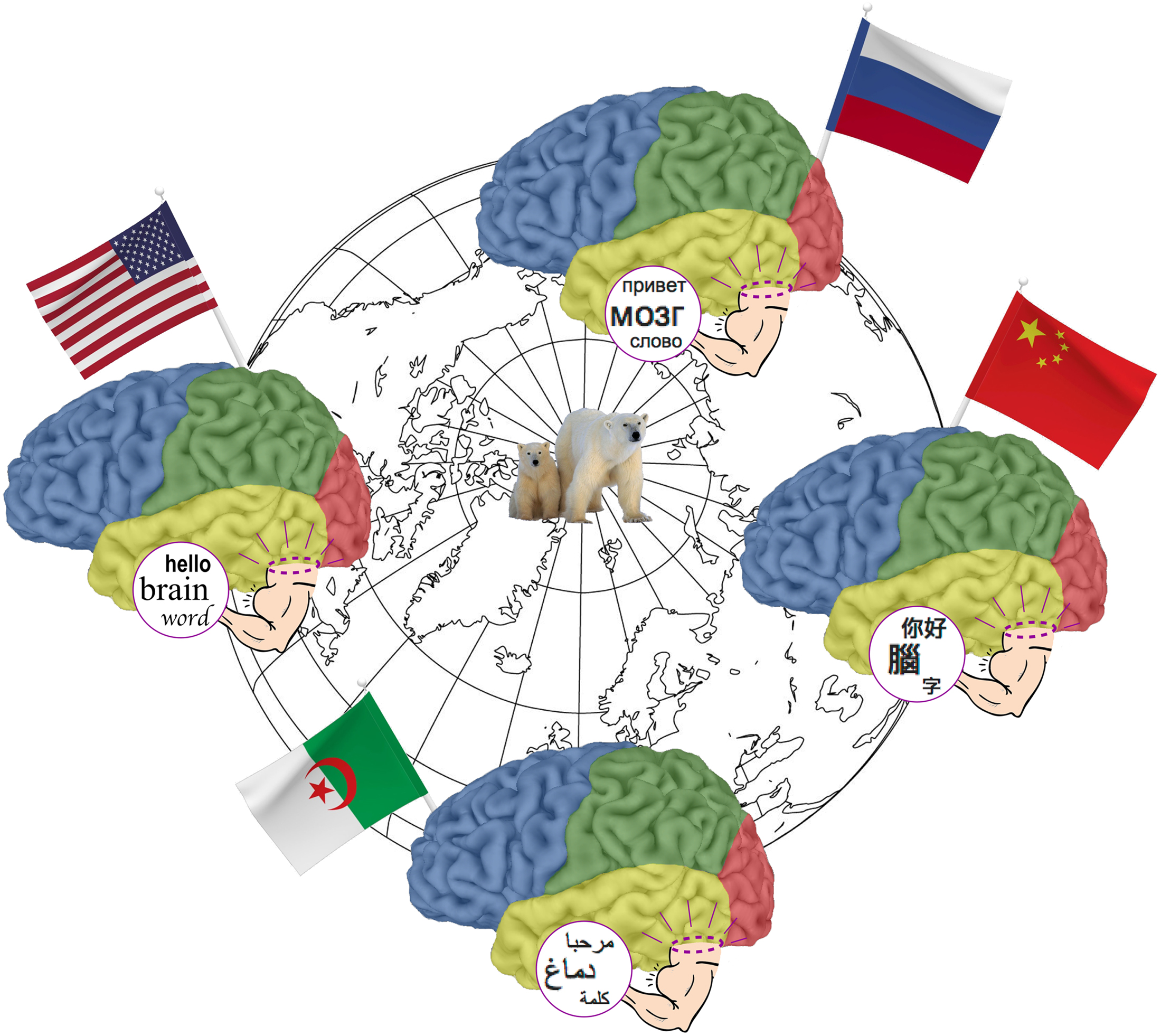
visual word form area3.jpg

The visual word form area (VWFA) is a functional region of the left fusiform gyrus and surrounding cortex (right-hand side being part of the fusiform face area) that is hypothesized to be involved in identifying words and letters from lower-level shape images, prior to association with phonology or semantics. Because the alphabet is relatively new in human evolution, it is unlikely that this region developed as a result of selection pressures related to word recognition per se; however, this region may be highly specialized for certain types of shapes that occur naturally in the environment and are therefore likely to surface within written language.

In addition to word recognition, the VWFA may participate in higher-level processing of word meaning.

It was previously believed that the VWFA did not discriminate according to word capitalization; however, in the brains of speakers of German (a language that capitalizes nouns) case-sensitivity is a real phenomenon registered in the VWFA. This discrepancy reflects the tendency in research in the cognitive sciences to privilege experiments conducted on predominantly English-speaking participants while neglecting work on the minds of speakers of other languages.

In 2003, functional imaging experiments raised doubts about whether the VWFA is an actual region. This skepticism has largely disappeared; however, there seems to be much variability in its size. An area that may fall within this mental organ in one person may fall outside it in someone else.

Anomalies in the activation of this region have been linked to reading disorders. If the area is subjected to a surgical lesion, the patient will suffer a clear impairment to reading ability but not to recognition of objects, names, or faces or to general language abilities. There will be some improvement over the next six months, but reading will still take twice as long as it had before surgery. Electrical brain stimulation to the VWFA causes reading-specific disruptions and can cause letter misperception.

== Visual word form hypotheses ==
=== Pre-lexical visual word form hypothesis ===
Put forward by Cohen and colleagues (2000). The basics of this theory state that the neurons in the ventral occipital-temporal cortex (vOT) – which the posterior fusiform gyrus is a part of – have receptive fields that are sensitive to bigrams, or two letter combinations that commonly occur in words. The neurons sense and process the bigrams, to detect their legality. Here the posterior left fusiform gyrus (part of the vOT), is thought to be one station in a long line of processing areas. The processing starts with visual feature detectors in extrastriate cortex, proceeding through letter detectors and letter-cluster detectors in the posterior fusiform, and then activating lexical representations stored in more anterior multimodal fusiform area. The theory states the function of the VWFA is pre-lexical as it occurs before the word is understood to have meaning.

=== Lexical visual word form hypothesis ===
Put forward by Kronbilcher et al. (2004), was based on functional imaging data that showed, in a parametric fMRI study, that a decrease in activation in the left fusiform gyrus was seen in response to an increase in the frequency of the word - where the frequency is how common the word is. This data refutes the previous pre-lexical theory as if the VWFA was pre-lexical one would expect equal activation throughout all frequencies. Instead a lexical theory was proposed where the left fusiform gyrus neurons are thought to detect words by attempting to match them to stored representations of known words. This would explain the data as more common words would take less time to detect than the less common words, reducing the energy needed for computation and therefore potentially reducing the magnitude of the haemodynamic response that is detected by BOLD fMRI.

A recent intracranial electrocorticography study shows that the activity in the VWFA goes through multiple stages of processing. Using classification with direct neural recordings from the VWFA, Hirshorn et al. showed that early VWFA activity, from approximately 100-250 milliseconds after reading a word, is consistent with a pre-lexical representation and later activity, from approximately 300-500 milliseconds is consistent with a lexical representation. These results potentially mediate between the pre-lexical and lexical hypotheses by showing that both levels of representation may be seen in the VWFA, but at different latencies after reading a word. Previous studies using fMRI did not have the temporal resolution to differentiate between these two stages.

== Alternative functions for the cortical area ascribed to the VWFA ==
Devlin et al. (2006) state that the left posterior fusiform gyrus is not a 'word form area' as such, but instead hypothesizes that the area is dedicated to determining word meaning. That is to say, that this area of the brain is where bottom-up information (visual shapes of words (form), and other visual attributes if necessary) comes into contact with top-down information (semantics and phonology of words). Therefore, the left fusiform gyrus is thought to be the interface in the processing of the words not a dictionary that computes a word based on its form alone, as the lexical word form hypothesis states. This paper also presents evidence that refutes the lexical hypothesis.

Another major difference between this hypothesis and the prior ones mentioned is that it is not limited to words alone but to any "meaningful stimulus", in fact non-sensical objects may activate the posterior fusiform cortex in order to extract their meaning from higher-level processes. However, the finding that disruption of the VWFA due to surgical lesions or electrical brain stimulation has little impact on a person's ability to extract meaning from non-word stimuli provides strong evidence that the function of the VWFA is primarily restricted to processing words and not "any meaningful stimulus."

However, there is some evidence that the VWFA is not specialized for reading specifically but instead has a set of specific properties and functions that make it useful for reading—and particularly important for fluid reading—but may also allow it to play roles in other forms of visual processing. VWFA involvement appears to depend partly on the visual complexity of a stimulus, and it appears to process recognizable visual stimuli that are grouped together. This may explain why "letter by letter" reading is still possible even when the VWFA suffers lesions that otherwise interfere with fluid reading ability. This may also address why the VWFA is activated even more strongly by line drawings and Amharic characters than by written words familiar to study participants.

== Involvement in Hyperlexia and Dyslexia ==
=== Hyperlexia ===
Some research suggests that children with autism spectrum disorders (ASD) may rely more heavily on visual perception areas—including the VWFA—and less heavily on phonological areas during reading tasks compared to non-ASD children. Greater activation of the VWFA may be particularly significant in children with hyperlexia, or reading ability beyond one's training. Hyperlexia is thought to be associated with ASD, with estimates of prevalence in autistic children ranging from 6 to 20.7%. One study of a hyperlexic child with ASD showed elevated activation compared to controls of the right posterior inferior temporal sulcus, where the right VWFA (R-VWFA) is thought to be located. This region is active during early stages of reading development, while a non-ASD child of the subject's reading level would be expected to make less use of this region in favor of phonological ("letter-to-sound") processes.

=== Dyslexia ===
Meta-analysis of studies of children and adults with dyslexia suggests that underactivation of the left occipitotemporal region—particularly the VWFA—may be involved in dyslexics' difficulty with fluid reading. These reading difficulties may also be related to poor connectivity between the VWFA and associated regions in the parietal cortex responsible for visual attention.

== See also ==
- Fusiform gyrus
- Reading
