= Middle English =

English language during the Middle Ages

- Englisch; English; Inglis
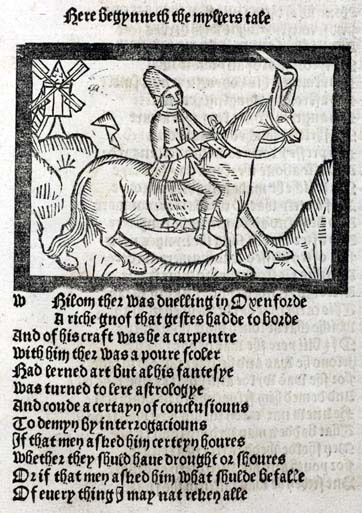
- A page from Geoffrey Chaucer's The Canterbury Tales, published in the late 14th century
- Region: England (except for west Cornwall), some localities in the eastern fringe of Wales, south east Scotland and Scottish burghs, to some extent Ireland
- Era: developed into Early Modern English, Early Scots. Fingallian language and Yola language by the 15th century
- Language family: Indo-European: Germanic; West Germanic; North Sea Germanic; Anglo-Frisian; Anglic; Middle English
- Early form: Old English
- Writing system: Latin

Language codes
- ISO 639-2: enm
- ISO 639-3: enm
- ISO 639-6: meng
- Glottolog: midd1317

Middle English (abbreviated to ME) refers to the variations of the English language that were spoken in England after the Norman Conquest of 1066, until the late 15th century, roughly coinciding with the High and Late Middle Ages. The Middle English dialects evolved from Old English under the influence of Anglo-Norman French and Old Norse. They were eventually replaced in England by Early Modern English, in Scotland by Early Scots, and in Ireland by the Fingallian language and the Yola language. The four main dialects in England were Northern, East Midland, West Midland, and Southern. Overall, Middle English exhibited significant regional variation in its vocabulary, grammar, pronunciation, and orthography.

During the Middle English period, many Old English grammatical features either became simplified or disappeared altogether. Noun, adjective, and verb inflections were simplified by the reduction (and eventual elimination) of most grammatical case distinctions. Middle English also saw considerable adoption of Anglo-Norman vocabulary, especially in the areas of politics, law, the arts, and religion, as well as poetic and emotive diction. Conventional English vocabulary remained primarily Germanic in its sources, with Old Norse influences becoming more apparent. Significant changes in pronunciation took place, particularly involving long vowels and diphthongs, which in the later Middle English period began to undergo the Great Vowel Shift.

Little survives of early Middle English literature, due in part to Norman domination and the prestige that came with writing in French rather than English. During the 14th century, a new style of literature emerged with the works of writers including John Wycliffe and Geoffrey Chaucer, whose Canterbury Tales remains the most studied and read work of the period. (Note: The name "tales of Canterbury" appears within the surviving texts of Chaucer's work.)

By the end of the period (about 1470), and aided by the invention of the printing press by Johannes Gutenberg in 1439, a standard based on the London dialects (Chancery Standard) had become established. This largely formed the basis for Modern English spelling, although pronunciation has changed considerably since that time. In England, Middle English was succeeded by Early Modern English, which lasted until about 1650. In Scotland, Early Scots developed concurrently from a variant of the Northumbrian Old English (prevalent in Northern England and spoken in southeast Scotland).

== History ==
=== Transition from Old English ===
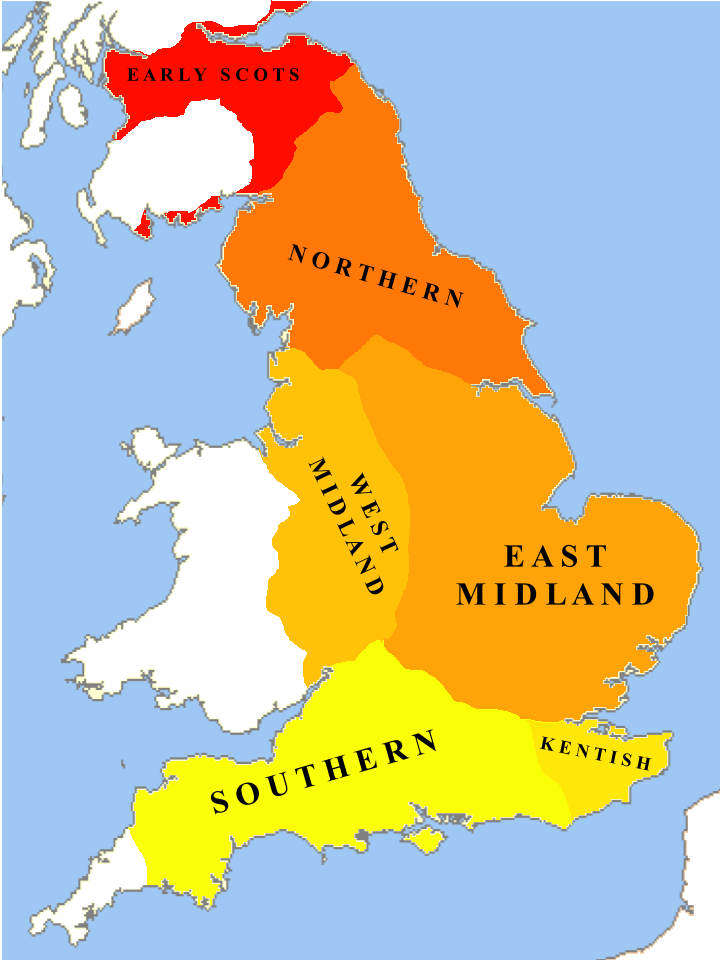
The dialects of Middle English c. 1300

The transition from Late Old English to Early Middle English had taken place by the 1150s to 1180s, the period when the Augustinian canon Orrm wrote the Ormulum, one of the oldest surviving texts in Middle English.

Contact with Old Norse aided the development of English from a synthetic language with relatively free word order to a more analytic language with a stricter word order, as both Old English and Old Norse were synthetic languages with complicated inflections. Communication between Vikings in the Danelaw and their Anglo-Saxon neighbours resulted in the erosion of inflection in both languages; this effect was characterized as being of a "substantive, pervasive, and of a democratic" manner. Old Norse and Old English closely resembled each other, and with a lot of vocabulary and grammatical structures in common, speakers of each language roughly understood each other, but according to the historian Simeon Potler, the main difference lay in their inflectional endings, which led to much confusion within the mixed population that existed in the Danelaw, thus endings tended gradually to become obscured and finally lost, "simplifying English grammar" in the process, leading to the emergence of the analytic pattern. The dramatic changes that happened in English contribute to the acceptance of the hypothesis that Old Norse had a more profound impact on the development of Middle and Modern English than any other language.

Viking influence on Old English is most apparent in pronouns, modals, comparatives, pronominal adverbs (like hence and together), conjunctions, and prepositions show the most marked Danish influence. The best evidence of Scandinavian influence appears in extensive word borrowings; however, texts from the period in Scandinavia and Northern England do not provide certain evidence of an influence on syntax.

While the Old Norse influence was strongest in the dialects under Danish control, which approximately covered Yorkshire, the central and eastern Midlands, and the East of England, words in the spoken language emerged in the 10th and 11th centuries near the transition from Old to Middle English. Influence on the written languages only appeared from the beginning of the 13th century onwards; this delay in Scandinavian lexical influence in English has been attributed to the lack of written evidence from the areas of Danish control, as the majority of written sources from Old English were produced in the West Saxon dialect spoken in Wessex, the heart of Anglo-Saxon political power at the time.

The Norman Conquest of England in 1066 saw the replacement of the top levels of the English-speaking political and ecclesiastical hierarchies by Norman rulers who spoke a dialect of Old French, now known as Old Norman, which developed in England into Anglo-Norman. The use of Norman as the preferred language of literature and polite discourse fundamentally altered the role of Old English in education and administration, even though many Normans of this period were illiterate and depended on the clergy for written communication and record-keeping. A significant number of Norman words were borrowed into English and used alongside native Germanic words with similar meanings. Examples of Germanic/Norman pairs in Modern English include pig and pork, calf and veal, wood and forest, and freedom and liberty. The role of Anglo-Norman as the language of government and law can be seen in the abundance of Modern English words for the mechanisms of government that are derived from Anglo-Norman, such as court, judge, jury, appeal, and parliament. There are also many Norman-derived terms relating to the chivalric cultures that arose in the 12th century, an era of feudalism, seigneurialism, and crusading.

Words were often taken from Latin, usually through French transmission. This gave rise to various synonyms, including kingly (inherited from Old English), royal (from French, inherited from Vulgar Latin), and regal (from French, which borrowed it from Classical Latin). Later French appropriations were derived from standard, rather than Norman, French. Examples of the resulting doublet pairs include warden (from Norman) and guardian (from later French; both share a common ancestor loaned from Germanic).

The end of Anglo-Saxon rule did not result in immediate changes to the language. The general population would have spoken the same dialects as they had before the Conquest. Once the writing of Old English came to an end, Middle English had no standard language, only dialects that evolved individually from Old English.

Ralph d'Escures' Homily on the Virgin Mary, a French work translated into Latin and then English in the first half of the 12th century, was either one of "the very latest compositions in Old English, or, as some scholars would have it, the very earliest in Middle English", having an Old English vocabulary co-existing with simplified inflexion.

=== Early Middle English ===
Early Middle English (1150–1350) has a largely Anglo-Saxon vocabulary (with many Norse borrowings in the northern parts of the country) but a greatly simplified inflectional system. The grammatical relations that were expressed in Old English by the dative and instrumental cases were replaced in Early Middle English with prepositional constructions. The Old English genitive -es survives in the -'s of the modern English possessive, but most of the other case endings disappeared in the Early Middle English period, including most of the roughly one dozen forms of the definite article ("the"). The dual personal pronouns (denoting exactly two) also disappeared from English during this period.

The loss of case endings was part of a general trend from inflections to fixed word order that also occurred in other Germanic languages (though more slowly and to a lesser extent). Therefore, it cannot be attributed simply to the influence of French-speaking sections of the population; English did, after all, remain the vernacular. It is also argued that Norse immigrants to England had a great impact on the loss of inflectional endings in Middle English. One argument is that, although Norse and English speakers were somewhat comprehensible to each other due to similar morphology, the Norse speakers' inability to reproduce the ending sounds of English words influenced Middle English's loss of inflectional endings.

Important texts for the reconstruction of the evolution of Middle English out of Old English are the Peterborough Chronicle, which continued to be compiled up to 1154; the Ormulum, a biblical commentary probably composed in Lincolnshire in the second half of the 12th century, incorporating a unique phonetic spelling system; and the Ancrene Wisse and the Katherine Group, religious texts written for anchoresses, apparently in the West Midlands in the early 13th century. The language found in the last two works is sometimes called the AB language, one of a range of regional dialects: East Midlands (London), South West (Kentish), Western (AB) and Northern. Additional literary sources of the 12th and 13th centuries include Layamon's Brut and The Owl and the Nightingale.

Some scholars have defined "Early Middle English" as encompassing English texts up to 1350. This longer time frame would extend the corpus to include many Middle English Romances (especially those of the Auchinleck manuscript c. 1330).

=== Late Middle English ===
Gradually, the wealthy and the government Anglicised again, although Norman (and subsequently French) remained the dominant language of literature and law until the 14th century, even after the loss of the majority of the continental possessions of the English monarchy.

The writing of this period, however, continues to reflect a variety of regional forms of English. The Ayenbite of Inwyt, a translation of a French confessional prose work, completed in 1340, is written in the Kentish dialect, represented in a rather consistent phonetic orthography. The best known writer of Middle English, Geoffrey Chaucer, wrote in the second half of the 14th century in the emerging London dialect, although he also portrays some of his characters as speaking in northern dialects, as in "The Reeve's Tale".

In the English-speaking areas of lowland Scotland, an independent standard was developing, based on the Northumbrian Old English. This would develop into what came to be known as the Early Scots.

A large number of terms for abstract concepts were adopted directly from scholastic philosophical Latin (rather than via French). Examples are "absolute", "act", "demonstration", and "probable".

=== Transition to Early Modern English ===
Emerging around 1430, the Chancery Standard was an official written English dialect firmly rooted in the East Midlands-influenced speech of London. This administrative script was pioneered in August 1417 when King Henry V began issuing his Signet letters to government officials in English, establishing a uniform style that directly influenced modern spelling. Multilingual clerks, proficient in French and Latin, shaped this blueprint by blending local London speech with Central East Midland Lollard texts. Although the Church and courts initially resisted by maintaining Latin and Law French, this national standard was slowly adopted by royal bureaucrats for most official purposes.

The Chancery Standard's influence on later forms of written English is disputed, but it did undoubtedly provide the core around which Early Modern English formed. Early Modern English emerged with the help of William Caxton's printing press, developed during the 1470s. The press stabilized English through a push towards standardization, led by Chancery Standard enthusiast and writer Richard Pynson. Early Modern English began in the 1540s after the printing and wide distribution of the English Bible and Prayer Book, which made the new standard of English publicly recognisable and lasted until about 1650.

== Phonology ==
The main changes between the Old English sound system and that of Middle English include:

- The emergence of the voiced fricatives /v/, /ð/, and /z/ as separate phonemes, rather than mere allophones of the corresponding voiceless fricatives;
- The reduction of Old English diphthongs to monophthongs and the emergence of new diphthongs, with reasons including vowel breaking in certain positions, the change of Old English post-vocalic /j/ and /w/ (sometimes resulting from the [ɣ] allophone of /ɡ/) to offglides, and borrowing from French;
- The merger of Old English /æ/ and /ɑ/ into a single vowel /a/;
- The raising of the long vowel /æː/ to /ɛː/;
- The rounding of /ɑː/ to /ɔː/ in the southern dialects;
- The unrounding of the front rounded vowels (/y/, /yː/, /ø/, and /øː/) to /i/, /iː/, /e/, and /eː/ in most dialects;
- The 13th-century lengthening of vowels in open syllables (and in certain other positions); the resultant long vowels (and other preexisting long vowels) subsequently underwent changes of quality in the Great Vowel Shift, which began during the late Middle English period;
- The loss of gemination (double consonants came to be pronounced as single ones);
- And the loss of weak final vowels (schwa, written ⟨e⟩). By Chaucer's time, this vowel was silent in normal speech, although it was normally pronounced in verse as the meter required (much as occurs in Modern French). Also, nonfinal unstressed ⟨e⟩ was dropped when adjacent to only a single consonant on either side if there was another short ⟨e⟩ in an adjoining syllable. Thus, every began to be pronounced as evry, and palmeres as palmers.

The combination of the last three processes listed above led to the spelling conventions associated with silent ⟨e⟩ and doubled consonants (see § Orthography below).

== Morphology ==
=== Nouns ===
Middle English retains only two distinct noun-ending patterns from the more complex system of inflection in Old English:

Middle English nouns
Nouns	Strong nouns		Weak nouns	
Nouns	Singular	Plural	Singular	Plural
Nominative	-(e)	-es	-e	-en
Accusative	-(e)	-es	-en	-en
Genitive	-es	-e(ne)	-en	-en
Dative	-e	-e(s)	-en	-en

Nouns of the weak declension are primarily inherited from Old English n-stem nouns but also from ō-stem, wō-stem, and u-stem nouns, which did not inflect in the same way as n-stem nouns in Old English, but joined the weak declension in Middle English. Nouns of the strong declension are inherited from the other Old English noun stem classes.

Some nouns of the strong type have an -e in the nominative/accusative singular, like the weak declension, but otherwise strong endings. Often, these are the same nouns that had an -e in the nominative/accusative singular of Old English (they, in turn, were inherited from Proto-Germanic ja-stem and i-stem nouns).

The distinct dative case was lost in early Middle English, and although the genitive survived, by the end of the Middle English period only the strong -'s ending (variously spelled) was in use. Some formerly feminine nouns, as well as some weak nouns, continued to make their genitive forms with -e or no ending (e.g., fole hoves, horses' hooves), and nouns of relationship ending in -er frequently have no genitive ending (e.g., fader bone, "father's bane").

The strong -(e)s plural form has survived into Modern English. The weak -(e)n form is now rare and used only in oxen and as part of a double plural, in children and brethren. Some dialects still have forms such as eyen (for eyes), shoon (for shoes), hosen (for hose(s)), kine (for cows), and been (for bees).

Grammatical gender survived to a limited extent in early Middle English before being replaced by natural gender in the course of the Middle English period. Grammatical gender was indicated by agreement of articles and pronouns (e.g., þo ule "the feminine owl") or using the pronoun he to refer to masculine nouns such as helm ("helmet"), or phrases such as scaft stærcne (strong shaft), with the masculine accusative adjective ending -ne.

=== Adjectives ===
Single-syllable adjectives added -e when modifying a noun in the plural and when used after the definite article (þe), after a demonstrative (þis, þat), after a possessive pronoun (e.g., hir, our), or with a name or in a form of address. This derives from the Old English "weak" declension of adjectives. This inflexion continued to be used in writing even after final -e had ceased to be pronounced. In earlier texts, multisyllable adjectives also receive a final -e in these situations, but this occurs less regularly in later Middle English texts. Otherwise, adjectives have no ending and adjectives already ending in -e etymologically receive no ending as well.

Earlier texts sometimes inflect adjectives for case as well. Layamon's Brut inflects adjectives for the masculine accusative, genitive, and dative, the feminine dative, and the plural genitive. The Owl and the Nightingale adds a final -e to all adjectives not in the nominative, here only inflecting adjectives in the weak declension (as described above).

Comparatives and superlatives were usually formed by adding -er and -est. Adjectives with long vowels sometimes shortened these vowels in the comparative and superlative (e.g., greet, great; gretter, greater). Adjectives ending in -ly or -lich formed comparatives either with -lier, -liest or -loker, -lokest. A few adjectives also displayed Germanic umlaut in their comparatives and superlatives, such as long, lenger. Other irregular forms were mostly the same as in modern English.

=== Pronouns ===
Middle English personal pronouns were mostly developed from those of Old English, with the exception of the third person plural, a borrowing from Old Norse. (The original Old English form clashed with the third person singular and was eventually dropped.) Also, the nominative form of the feminine third person singular was replaced by a form of the demonstrative that developed into sche (modern she), but the alternative heyr remained in some areas for a long time.

As with nouns, there was some inflectional simplification (the distinct Old English dual forms were lost), but pronouns, unlike nouns, retained distinct nominative and accusative forms. Third person pronouns also retained a distinction between accusative and dative forms, but that was gradually lost: The masculine hine was replaced by him south of the River Thames by the early 14th century, and the neuter dative him was ousted by it in most dialects by the 15th.

The following table shows some of the various Middle English pronouns. Many other variations are noted in Middle English sources because of differences in spellings and pronunciations at different times and in different dialects.

Middle English personal pronouns Below each Middle English pronoun, the Modern English is shown in italics (with archaic forms in parentheses)
Person / gender		Subject	Object	Possessive determiner	Possessive pronoun	Reflexive
Singular
First		ic / ich / I I	me / mi me	min / minen [pl.] my	min / mire / minre mine	min one / mi seluen myself
Second		þou / þu / tu / þeou you (thou)	þe you (thee)	þi / ti your (thy)	þin / þyn yours (thine)	þeself / þi seluen yourself (thyself)
Third	Masculine	he he	him (Note: Dative case, indirect object) / hine (Note: Accusative case, direct object) him	his / hisse / hes his	his / hisse his	him-seluen himself
Third	Feminine	sche[o] / s[c]ho / ȝho she	heo / his / hie / hies / hire her	hio / heo / hire / heore her	- hers	heo-seolf herself
Third	Neuter	hit it	hit / him it	his its	his its	hit sulue itself
Plural
First		we we	us / ous us	ure[n] / our[e] / ures / urne our	oures ours	us self / ous silue ourselves
Second		ȝe / ye you (ye)	eow / [ȝ]ou / ȝow / gu / you you	eower / [ȝ]ower / gur / [e]our your	youres yours	Ȝou self / ou selue yourselves
Third	From Old English	heo / he	his / heo[m]	heore / her	-	-
Third	From Old Norse	þa / þei / þeo / þo	þem / þo	þeir	-	þam-selue
Third	modern	they	them	their	theirs	themselves

=== Verbs ===
As a general rule, the indicative first person singular of verbs in the present tense ended in -e (e.g., ich here, "I hear"), the second person singular in -(e)st (e.g., þou spekest, "thou speakest"), and the third person singular in -eþ (e.g., he comeþ, "he cometh/he comes"). (þ (the letter "thorn") is pronounced like the unvoiced th in "think", but under certain circumstances, it may be like the voiced th in "that"). The following table illustrates a typical conjugation pattern:

Middle English verb inflection
Verbs inflection	Infinitive	Present					Past				
Verbs inflection	Infinitive	Participle	Singular			Plural	Participle	Singular			Plural
Verbs inflection	Infinitive	Participle	1st person	2nd person	3rd person	Plural	Participle	1st person	2nd person	3rd person	Plural
Regular verbs
Strong	-en	-ende, -ynge	-e	-est	-eþ (-es)	-en (-es, -eþ)	i- -en	–	-e (-est)	–	-en
Weak	-en	-ende, -ynge	-e	-est	-eþ (-es)	-en (-es, -eþ)	-ed	-ede	-edest	-ede	-eden
Irregular verbs
Been "be"	been	beende, beynge	am	art	is	aren	ibeen	was	wast	was	weren
Been "be"	been	beende, beynge	be	bist	biþ	beth, been	ibeen	was	were	was	weren
Cunnen "can"	cunnen	cunnende, cunnynge	can	canst	can	cunnen	cunned, coud	coude, couthe	coudest, couthest	coude, couthe	couden, couthen
Don "do"	don	doende, doynge	do	dost	doþ, doth	doþ, don	idon	didde	didst	didde	didden
Douen "be good for"	douen	douende, douynge	deigh	deight	deigh	douen	idought	dought	doughtest	dought	doughten
Durren "dare"	durren	durrende, durrynge	dar	darst	dar	durren	durst, dirst	durst	durstest	durst	dursten
Gon "go"	Gon	goende, goynge	go	gost	goþ	goþ, gon	igon(gen)	wend, yede, yode	wendest, yedest, yodest	wende, yede, yode	wenden, yeden, yoden
Haven "have"	haven	havende, havynge	have	hast	haþ	haven	ihad	hadde	haddest	hadde	hadden
Moten "must"	–	–	mot	must	mot	moten	–	muste	mustest	muste	musten
Mowen "may"	mowen	mowende, mowynge	may	myghst	may	mowen	imought	mighte	mightest	mighte	mighten
Owen "owe, ought"	owen	owende, owynge	owe	owest	owe	owen	iowen	owed	ought	owed	ought
Schulen "should"	–	–	schal	schalt	schal	schulen	–	scholde	scholdest	scholde	scholde
Þurven/Þaren "need"	–	–	þarf	þarst	þarf	þurven, þaren	–	þurft	þurst	þurft	þurften
Willen "want"	willen	willende, willynge	will	wilt	will	wollen	–	wolde	woldest	wolde	wolden
Witen "know"	witen	witende, witynge	woot	woost	woot	witen	iwiten	wiste	wistest	wiste	wisten

Plural forms vary strongly by dialect, with Southern dialects preserving the Old English -eþ, Midland dialects showing -en from about 1200, and Northern forms using -es in the third person singular as well as the plural.

The past tense of weak verbs was formed by adding an -ed(e), -d(e), or -t(e) ending. The past-tense forms, without their personal endings, also served as past participles with past-participle prefixes derived from Old English: i-, y-, and sometimes bi-.

Strong verbs, by contrast, formed their past tense by changing their stem vowel (e.g., binden became bound, a process called apophony), as in Modern English.

== Orthography ==
Manuscript copy of Piers Ploughman

With the discontinuation of the Late West Saxon standard used for the writing of Old English in the period prior to the Norman Conquest, Middle English came to be written in a wide variety of scribal forms, reflecting different regional dialects and orthographic conventions. Later in the Middle English period, however, and particularly with the development of the Chancery Standard in the 15th century, orthography became relatively standardised in a form based on the East Midlands-influenced speech of London. Spelling at the time was mostly quite regular. (There was a fairly consistent correspondence between letters and sounds.) The irregularity of present-day English orthography is largely due to pronunciation changes that have taken place over the Early Modern English and Modern English eras.

Middle English generally did not have silent letters. For example, knight was pronounced [ˈkniçt] (with both the ⟨k⟩ and the ⟨gh⟩ pronounced, the latter sounding as the ⟨ch⟩ in German Ich). The major exception was the silent ⟨e⟩ – originally pronounced but lost in normal speech by Chaucer's time. This letter, however, came to indicate a lengthened – and later also modified – pronunciation of a preceding vowel. For example, in name, originally pronounced as two syllables, the /a/ in the first syllable (originally an open syllable) lengthened, the final weak vowel was later dropped, and the remaining long vowel was modified in the Great Vowel Shift (for these sound changes, see Phonology, above). The final ⟨e⟩, now silent, thus became the indicator of the longer and changed pronunciation of ⟨a⟩. In fact, vowels could have this lengthened and modified pronunciation in various positions, particularly before a single consonant letter and another vowel or before certain pairs of consonants.

A related convention involved the doubling of consonant letters to show that the preceding vowel was not to be lengthened. In some cases, the double consonant represented a sound that was (or had previously been) geminated (i.e., had genuinely been "doubled" and would thus have regularly blocked the lengthening of the preceding vowel). In other cases, by analogy, the consonant was written double merely to indicate the lack of lengthening.

=== Alphabet ===
The basic Old English Latin alphabet consisted of 20 standard letters plus four additional letters: ash ⟨æ⟩, eth ⟨ð⟩, thorn ⟨þ⟩, and wynn ⟨ƿ⟩. There was not yet a distinct j, v, or w, and Old English scribes did not generally use k, q, or z.

Ash was no longer required in Middle English, as the Old English vowel /æ/ that it represented had merged into /a/. The symbol nonetheless came to be used as a ligature for the digraph ⟨ae⟩ in many words of Greek or Latin origin, as did ⟨œ⟩ for ⟨oe⟩.

Eth and thorn both represented /θ/ or its allophone /ð/ in Old English. Eth fell out of use during the 13th century and was replaced by thorn. Thorn mostly fell out of use during the 14th century and was replaced by ⟨th⟩. Anachronistic usage of the scribal abbreviation yͤ (þe, "the") has led to the modern mispronunciation of thorn as ⟨y⟩ in this context; see ye olde.

Wynn, which represented the phoneme /w/, was replaced by ⟨w⟩ during the 13th century. Due to its similarity to the letter ⟨p⟩, it is mostly represented by ⟨w⟩ in modern editions of Old and Middle English texts even when the manuscript has wynn.

Under Norman influence, the continental Carolingian minuscule replaced the insular script that had been used for Old English. However, because of the significant difference in appearance between the old insular g and the Carolingian g (modern g), the former continued in use as a separate letter, known as yogh, written ⟨ȝ⟩. This was adopted for use to represent a variety of sounds: [ɣ], [j], [dʒ], [x], [ç], while the Carolingian g was normally used for [g]. Instances of yogh were eventually replaced by ⟨j⟩ or ⟨y⟩ and by ⟨gh⟩ in words like night and laugh. In Early Scots, yogh became indistinguishable from cursive z, and printers tended to use ⟨z⟩ when yogh was not available in their fonts; this led to new spellings (often giving rise to new pronunciations), as in McKenzie, where the ⟨z⟩ replaced a yogh, which had the pronunciation /j/.

Under continental influence, the letters ⟨k⟩, ⟨q⟩, and ⟨z⟩, which had not normally been used by Old English scribes, came to be commonly used in the writing of Middle English. Also, the newer Latin letter ⟨w⟩ was introduced (replacing wynn). The distinct letter forms ⟨v⟩ and ⟨u⟩ came into use but were still used interchangeably; the same applies to ⟨j⟩ and ⟨i⟩. (For example, spellings such as wijf and paradijs for "wife" and "paradise" can be found in Middle English.)

The consonantal ⟨j⟩/⟨i⟩ was sometimes used to transliterate the Hebrew letter yodh, representing the palatal approximant sound /j/ (and transliterated in Greek by iota and in Latin by ⟨i⟩); words like Jerusalem, Joseph, etc. would have originally followed the Latin pronunciation beginning with /j/, that is, the sound of ⟨y⟩ in yes. In some words, however, notably from Old French, ⟨j⟩/⟨i⟩ was used for the affricate consonant /dʒ/, as in joie (modern "joy"), used in Wycliffe's Bible. This was similar to the geminate sound [ddʒ], which had been represented as ⟨cg⟩ in Old English. By the time of Modern English, the sound came to be written as ⟨j⟩/⟨i⟩ at the start of words (like "joy"), and usually as ⟨dg⟩ elsewhere (as in "bridge"). It could also be written, mainly in French loanwords, as ⟨g⟩, with the adoption of the soft G convention (age, page, etc.)

=== Other symbols ===
Many scribal abbreviations were also used. It was common for the Lollards to abbreviate the name of Jesus (as in Latin manuscripts) to ihc. The letters ⟨n⟩ and ⟨m⟩ were often omitted and indicated by a macron above an adjacent letter, so for example, in could be written as ī. A thorn with a superscript ⟨t⟩ or ⟨e⟩ could be used for that and the; the thorn here resembled a ⟨Y⟩, giving rise to the ye of "Ye Olde". Various forms of the ampersand replaced the word and.

Numbers were still always written using Roman numerals, except for some rare occurrences of Arabic numerals during the 15th century.

=== Letter-to-sound correspondences ===
Although Middle English spelling was never fully standardised, the following table shows the pronunciations most usually represented by particular letters and digraphs towards the end of the Middle English period, using the notation given in the article on Middle English phonology. As explained above, single vowel letters had alternative pronunciations depending on whether they were in a position where their sounds had been subject to lengthening. Long vowel pronunciations were in flux due to the beginnings of the Great Vowel Shift.

Symbol	Description and notes
a	/a/, or in lengthened positions /aː/, becoming [æː] by about 1500. Sometimes /au/ before ⟨l⟩ or nasals (see Late Middle English diphthongs).
ai, ay	/ai/ (alternatively denoted by /ɛi/; see vein–vain merger).
au, aw	/au/
b	/b/, but in later Middle English became silent in words ending -mb (while some words that never had a /b/ sound came to be spelt -mb by analogy; see reduction of /mb/).
c	/k/, but /s/ (earlier /ts/) before ⟨e⟩, ⟨i⟩, ⟨y⟩ (see C and hard and soft C for details).
ch	/tʃ/
ck	/k/, replaced earlier ⟨kk⟩ as the doubled form of ⟨k⟩ (for the phenomenon of doubling, see above).
d	/d/
e	/e/, or in lengthened positions /eː/ or sometimes /ɛː/ (see ee). For silent ⟨e⟩, see above.
ea	Rare, for /ɛː/ (see ee).
ee	/eː/, becoming [iː] by about 1500; or /ɛː/, becoming [eː] by about 1500. In Early Modern English the latter vowel came to be commonly written ⟨ea⟩. The two vowels later merged.
ei, ey	Sometimes the same as ⟨ai⟩; sometimes /ɛː/ or /eː/ (see also fleece merger).
ew	Either /ɛu/ or /iu/ (see Late Middle English diphthongs; these later merged).
f	/f/
g	/ɡ/, or /dʒ/ before ⟨e⟩, ⟨i⟩, ⟨y⟩ (see ⟨g⟩ for details). The ⟨g⟩ in initial gn- was still pronounced.
gh	[ç] or [x], post-vowel allophones of /h/ (this was formerly one of the uses of yogh). The ⟨gh⟩ is often retained in Chancery spellings even though the sound was starting to be lost.
h	/h/ (except for the allophones for which ⟨gh⟩ was used). Also used in several digraphs (⟨ch⟩, ⟨th⟩, etc.). In some French loanwords, such as horrible, the ⟨h⟩ was silent.
i, j	As a vowel, /i/, or in lengthened positions /iː/, which had started to be diphthongised by about 1500. As a consonant, /dʒ/ ((corresponding to modern ⟨j⟩); see above).
ie	Used sometimes for /ɛː/ (see ee).
k	/k/, used particularly in positions where ⟨c⟩ would be softened. Also used in ⟨kn⟩ at the start of words; here both consonants were still pronounced.
l	/l/
m	/m/
n	/n/, including its allophone [ŋ] (before /k/, /ɡ/).
o	/o/, or in lengthened positions /ɔː/ or sometimes /oː/ (see oo). Sometimes /u/, as in sone (modern son); the ⟨o⟩ spelling was often used rather than ⟨u⟩ when adjacent to i, m, n, v, w for legibility, i.e. to avoid a succession of vertical strokes.
oa	Rare, for /ɔː/ (became commonly used in Early Modern English).
oi, oy	/ɔi/ or /ui/ (see Late Middle English diphthongs; these later merged).
oo	/oː/, becoming [uː] by about 1500; or /ɔː/.
ou, ow	Either /uː/, which had started to be diphthongised by about 1500, or /ɔu/.
p	/p/
qu	/kw/
r	/r/
s	/s/, sometimes /z/ (formerly [z] was an allophone of /s/). Also appeared as ſ (long s).
sch, sh	/ʃ/
t	/t/
th	/θ/ or /ð/ (which had previously been allophones of a single phoneme), replacing earlier eth and thorn, although thorn was still sometimes used.
u, v	Used interchangeably. As a consonant, /v/. As a vowel, /u/, or /iu/ in "lengthened" positions (although it had generally not gone through the same lengthening process as other vowels – see Development of /juː/).
w	/w/ (replaced Old English wynn).
wh	/hw/ (see English ⟨wh⟩).
x	/ks/
y	As a consonant, /j/ (earlier this was one of the uses of yogh). Sometimes also /ɡ/. As a vowel, the same as ⟨i⟩, where ⟨y⟩ is often preferred beside letters with downstrokes.
z	/z/ (in Scotland sometimes used as a substitute for yogh; see above).

== Sample texts ==
Most of the following Modern English translations are poetic sense-for-sense translations, not word-for-word translations.

=== Ormulum, 12th century ===
This passage explains the background to the Nativity (3494–501):

Forrþrihht anan se time comm þatt ure Drihhtin wollde ben borenn i þiss middellærd forr all mannkinne nede he chæs himm sone kinnessmenn all swillke summ he wollde and whær he wollde borenn ben he chæs all att hiss wille.	Forthwith when the time came that our Lord wanted be born in this earth for all mankind sake, He chose kinsmen for Himself, all just as he wanted, and where He would be born He chose all at His will.

=== Epitaph of John the smyth, died 1371 ===
An epitaph from a monumental brass in an Oxfordshire parish church:

Original text	Word-for-word translation into Modern English	Translation by Patricia Utechin
man com & se how schal alle dede li: wen þow comes bad & bare noth hab ven ve awaẏ fare: All ẏs wermēs þ^{t} ve for care:— bot þ^{t} ve do for godẏs luf ve haue nothyng yare: hundyr þis graue lẏs John þe smẏth god yif his soule heuen grit	Man, come and see how shall all dead lie: when thou comes bad and bare naught have when we away fare: all is worms that we for care:— but that we do for God's love, we have nothing ready: under this grave lies John the smith, God give his soul heaven grith	Man, come and see how all dead men shall lie: when that comes bad and bare, we have nothing when we away fare: all that we care for is worms:— except for that which we do for God's sake, we have nothing ready: under this grave lies John the smith, God give his soul heavenly peace

=== Pre-Wycliffite Bibles ===
James 1:5,6
West Midlands (Herefordshire) dialect (Selwyn College lOS. L. 1.)	Southern dialect (MS. Bodl. Douce 250.)	Early Modern English (KJM 1611)	Modern English
5. And who-efere of ȝou nedeþ wysdom, axe he of God, þat graunteþ eferich man plentyuouslyche and obbraydeþ no man.; 6. & axe he in feiþ & trust, doutynge no þing: For he þat douteþ is lyche to þe flod of þe see þat is y-mefed & y-boren aboute of þe wynd.	5. & whuche of ȝow so haþ nede of wysdom, aske of God þat ȝeveþ plentyuously to alle, & withstonde him nouȝte, & it schal be ȝove to him.; 6. Aske he soþely in feiþ, nouȝte faylynge: for soþely he þat is faylynge (þat is, faylynge in þe feiþ) he is lyke to þe flowynge of þe see þe whuche is mevyd wiþ þe wynde & bore a-boute.	5. If any of you lack wisdom, let him ask of God, that giveth to all men liberally, and upbraideth not; and it shall be given him.; 6. But let him ask in faith, nothing wavering. For he that wavereth is like a wave of the sea driven with the wind and tossed.	5. Any of you who lacks wisdom must ask God, who gives to all generously and without scolding; it will be given.; 6. But the prayer must be made with faith, and no trace of doubt, because a person who has doubts is like the waves thrown up in the sea by the buffeting of the wind.

=== Wycliffite Bibles ===
From the Wycliffe's Bible:

Luke 8:1–3
Early version (c. 1380s)	Later version (c. 1390s)	Translation
^{1}And it was don aftirward, and Jhesu made iorney by citees and castelis, prechinge and euangelysinge þe rewme of God, ^{2}and twelue wiþ him; and summe wymmen þat weren heelid of wickide spiritis and syknessis, Marie, þat is clepid Mawdeleyn, of whom seuene deuelis wenten ^{3} out, and Jone, þe wyf of Chuse, procuratour of Eroude, and Susanne, and manye oþere, whiche mynystriden to him of her riches.	^{1}And it was don aftirward, and Jhesus made iourney bi citees and castels, prechynge and euangelisynge þe rewme of ^{2}God, and twelue wiþ hym; and sum wymmen þat weren heelid of wickid spiritis and sijknessis, Marie, þat is clepid Maudeleyn, of whom seuene deuelis ^{3}wenten out, and Joone, þe wijf of Chuse, þe procuratoure of Eroude, and Susanne, and many oþir, þat mynystriden to hym of her ritchesse.	^{1}And it was done afterwards, that Jesus made a journey by cities and castles, preaching and evangelising the realm of ^{2}God: and with him (the) Twelve; and some women that were healed of wicked spirits and sicknesses; Mary who is called Magdalene, from whom ^{3}seven devils went out; and Joanna the wife of Chuza, the procurator of Herod; and Susanna, and many others, who ministered to Him out of her riches.

=== Chaucer, 1390s ===
The following is the very beginning of the General Prologue from The Canterbury Tales by Geoffrey Chaucer. The text was written in a dialect associated with London and spellings associated with the then-emergent Chancery Standard.

First 18 lines of the General Prologue
Original in Middle English	Word-for-word translation into Modern English	Translation into Modern U.K. English prose
Whan that Aprill, with his shoures soote	When that April with his showers sweet	When April with its sweet showers
The droȝte of March hath perced to the roote	The drought of March has pierced to the root	has drenched March's drought to the roots,
And bathed every veyne in swich licour,	And bathed every vein in such liquor,	filling every capillary with nourishing sap
Of which vertu engendred is the flour;	Of which virtue engendered is the flower;	prompting the flowers to grow,
Whan Zephirus eek with his sweete breeth	When Zephyrus even with his sweet breath	and when Zephyrus with his sweet breath
Inspired hath in every holt and heeth	Inspired has in every holt and heath	has coaxed in every wood and dale, to sprout
The tendre croppes, and the yonge sonne	The tender crops; and the young sun	the tender plants, as the springtime sun
Hath in the Ram his halfe cours yronne,	Has in the Ram his half-course run,	passes halfway through the sign of Aries,
And smale foweles maken melodye,	And small birds make melodies,	and small birds that chirp melodies,
That slepen al the nyght with open ye	That sleep all night with open eyes	sleep all night with half-open eyes
(So priketh hem Nature in hir corages);	(So Nature prompts them in Her courage);	their spirits thus aroused by Nature;
Thanne longen folk to goon on pilgrimages	Then folk long to go on pilgrimages.	it is at these times that people desire to go on pilgrimages
And palmeres for to seken straunge strondes	And palmers for to seek new strands	and pilgrims (palmers) seek new shores
To ferne halwes, kowthe in sondry londes;	To far-off hallows, couth in sundry lands;	and distant shrines venerated in other places.
And specially from every shires ende	And specially from every shire's end	Particularly from every county
Of Engelond, to Caunterbury they wende,	Of England, to Canterbury they went,	from England, they go to Canterbury,
The hooly blisful martir for to seke	The holy blissful martyr for to seek,	in order to visit the holy blessed martyr,
That hem hath holpen, whan that they were seeke.	That has helped them, when that they were sick.	who has helped them when they were sick.

=== Gower, 1390 ===
The following is the beginning of the Prologue from Confessio Amantis by John Gower.

Original in Middle English	Near word-for-word translation into Modern English:	Translation into Modern English: (by Richard Brodie)
Of hem that written ous tofore The bokes duelle, and we therfore Ben tawht of that was write tho: Forthi good is that we also In oure tyme among ous hiere Do wryte of newe som matiere, Essampled of these olde wyse So that it myhte in such a wyse, Whan we ben dede and elleswhere, Beleve to the worldes eere In tyme comende after this. Bot for men sein, and soth it is, That who that al of wisdom writ It dulleth ofte a mannes wit To him that schal it aldai rede, For thilke cause, if that ye rede, I wolde go the middel weie And wryte a bok betwen the tweie, Somwhat of lust, somewhat of lore, That of the lasse or of the more Som man mai lyke of that I wryte:	Of them that wrote us before The books dwell, and we therefore Been taught of that was written then: For it is good that we also In our time among us here Do write some new matter, Exampled by these old wise ones, So that it might in such a way, When we be dead and elsewhere, Be left to the world's ear In time coming after this. But for men say, and so it is, That who that all of wisdom writes It dulls often a man's wit To him that shall it every day read, For that like cause, if that you read, I would go the middle way And write a book between the two, Somewhat of lust, somewhat of lore, That of the less or of the more Some man may like of that I write:	Of those who wrote before our lives Their precious legacy survives; From what was written then, we learn, And so it's well that we in turn, In our allotted time on earth Do write anew some things of worth, Like those we from these sages cite, So that such in like manner might, When we have left this mortal sphere, Remain for all the world to hear In ages following our own. But it is so that men are prone To say that when one only reads Of wisdom all day long, one breeds A paucity of wit, and so If you agree I'll choose to go Along a kind of middle ground Sometimes I'll write of things profound, And sometimes for amusement's sake A lighter path of pleasure take So all can something pleasing find.

Translation in Modern English: (by J. Dow)

Of those who wrote before we were born, books survive,

So we are taught what was written by them when they were alive. So it's good that we, in our times here on earth, write of new matters – Following the example of our forefathers – So that, in such a way, we may leave our knowledge to the world after we are dead and gone. But it's said, and it is true, that if one only reads of wisdom all day long It often dulls one's brains. So, if it's alright with you, I'll take the middle route and write a book between the two – Somewhat of amusement, and somewhat of fact.

In that way, somebody might, more or less, like that.

== See also ==
- Medulla Grammatice (collection of glossaries)
- Middle English creole hypothesis
- Middle English Dictionary
- Middle English literature
- A Linguistic Atlas of Early Middle English
- Medieval English Poetry: The Non-Chaucerian Tradition. by John Spiers.
