= Ye (pronoun) =

Archaic second-person pronoun in English

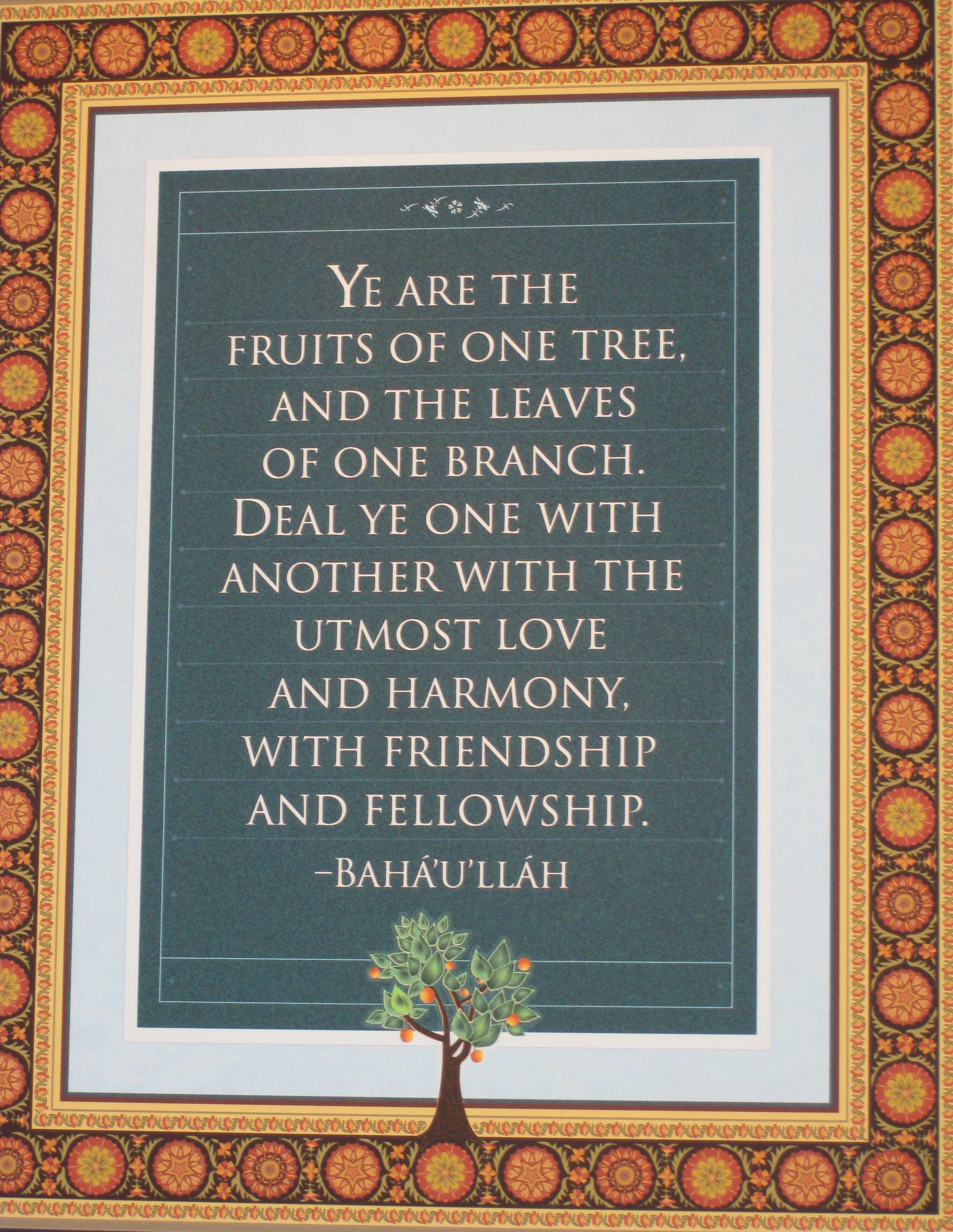
The pronoun "Ye" used in a quote from the Baháʼu'lláh

Ye (/jiː/, unstressed /jɪ/ or /jə/) is a second-person, plural, personal pronoun (nominative), spelled in Old English as "ge". In Middle English and Early Modern English, it was used as both an informal second-person plural and a formal honorific, to address a group of equals or superiors or a single superior. Although its use is archaic in most of the English-speaking world, it is used in Newfoundland and Labrador in Canada and in many parts of Ireland, to distinguish from the singular you. It is also a typical singular and plural form of you in Scots and certain dialects in England, such as Geordie.

In southeastern England, ye had disappeared by c. 1600 in regular speech, being replaced by the original oblique case form you.

== Etymology ==
In Old English, the use of second-person pronouns was governed by a simple rule: þū addressed one person, ġit addressed two people, and ġē addressed more than two. After the Norman Conquest, which marks the beginning of the French vocabulary influence that characterised the Middle English period, the plural gradually replaced singular as the form of address for a superior and later for an equal. T–V distinction — the practice of matching singular and plural forms with informal and formal connotations, respectively — in English is largely due to the influence of French. This began with the practice of addressing kings and other aristocrats in the plural. Eventually, this was generalised, as in French, to address any social superior or stranger with a plural pronoun, which was believed to be more polite.

Following the French-language conventions, the word þū evolved into thou and became the informal second-person singular pronoun. In Early Modern English, ye functioned as both an informal plural and formal singular second-person nominative pronoun. "Ye" is still commonly used as an informal plural in Hiberno‐English and Newfoundland English. Both dialects also use variants of "ye" for alternative cases, such as "yeer" (your), "yeers" (yours), and "yeerselves" (yourselves).

The pronoun is also sometimes used as a literary device, as in poetry, e.g. "Ye are many—they are few!" (Percy Bysshe Shelley, The Masque of Anarchy, 1819).

Old English pronouns
			Nominative	IPA	Accusative	Dative	Genitive
1st	Singular		iċ	[itʃ]	mec / mē	mē	mīn
1st	Dual		wit	[wit]	uncit	unc	uncer
1st	Plural		wē	[weː]	ūsic	ūs	ūser / ūre
2nd	Singular		þū	[θuː]	þec / þē	þē	þīn
2nd	Dual		ġit	[jit]	incit	inc	incer
2nd	Plural		ġē	[jeː]	ēowic	ēow	ēower
3rd	Singular	Masculine	hē	[heː]	hine	him	his
3rd	Singular	Neuter	hit	[hit]	hit	him	his
3rd	Singular	Feminine	hēo	[heːo]	hīe	hiere	hiere
3rd	Plural		hīe	[hiːy]	hīe	heom	heora

Middle English personal pronouns Below each Middle English pronoun, the Modern English is shown in italics (with archaic forms in parentheses)
Person / gender		Subject	Object	Possessive determiner	Possessive pronoun	Reflexive
Singular
First		ic / ich / I I	me / mi me	min / minen [pl.] my	min / mire / minre mine	min one / mi seluen myself
Second		þou / þu / tu / þeou you (thou)	þe you (thee)	þi / ti your (thy)	þin / þyn yours (thine)	þeself / þi seluen yourself (thyself)
Third	Masculine	he he	him (Note: Dative case, indirect object) / hine (Note: Accusative case, direct object) him	his / hisse / hes his	his / hisse his	him-seluen himself
Third	Feminine	sche[o] / s[c]ho / ȝho she	heo / his / hie / hies / hire her	hio / heo / hire / heore her	- hers	heo-seolf herself
Third	Neuter	hit it	hit / him it	his its	his its	hit sulue itself
Plural
First		we we	us / ous us	ure[n] / our[e] / ures / urne our	oures ours	us self / ous silue ourselves
Second		ȝe / ye you (ye)	eow / [ȝ]ou / ȝow / gu / you you	eower / [ȝ]ower / gur / [e]our your	youres yours	Ȝou self / ou selue yourselves
Third	From Old English	heo / he	his / heo[m]	heore / her	-	-
Third	From Old Norse	þa / þei / þeo / þo	þem / þo	þeir	-	þam-selue
Third	modern	they	them	their	theirs	themselves

Personal pronouns in Early Modern English
		Nominative	Oblique	Genitive	Possessive	Reflexive
1st person	singular	I	me	my/mine (Note: The genitives my, mine, thy, and thine are used as possessive adjectives before a noun, or as possessive pronouns without a noun. All four forms are used as possessive adjectives: mine and thine are used before nouns beginning in a vowel sound, or before nouns beginning in the letter h, which was usually silent (e.g. thine eyes and mine heart, which was pronounced as mine art) and my and thy before consonants (thy mother, my love). However, only mine and thine are used as possessive pronouns, as in it is thine and they were mine (not *they were my).)	mine	my selfe
1st person	plural	we	us	our	ours	our selves
2nd person	singular informal	thou	thee	thy/thine	thine	thy selfe
2nd person	plural informal	ye (you) (Note: Ye had fallen out of use by c. 1600, being replaced by the original oblique you.)	you	your	yours	your selves
2nd person	formal	ye (you)	you	your	yours	your selves
3rd person	singular	he/she/it	him/her/it	his/her/his (it) (Note: From the early Early Modern English period up until the 17th century, his was the possessive of the third-person neuter it as well as of the third-person masculine he. Genitive it appears once in the 1611 King James Bible (Leviticus 25:5) as groweth of it owne accord.)	his/hers/his	himselfe/her selfe/it selfe
3rd person	plural	they	them	their	theirs	themselves

== Confusion with the definite article ye ==
In Early Modern English, þe (the) was commonly spelled ye because early printing presses from France did not have the letter þ. This is often seen in pseudo-Early Modern English phrases such as Ye Olde.

== See also ==
- Y'all
- Yinz
