= They =

Third-person plural or gender-neutral pronoun

In Modern English, they is a third-person pronoun relating to a grammatical subject.

== Morphology ==
In Standard Modern English, they has five distinct word forms:

- they: the nominative (subjective) form
- them: the accusative (objective, called the 'oblique'.) and a non-standard determinative form.
- their: the dependent genitive (possessive) form
- theirs: independent genitive form
- themselves: prototypical reflexive form
- themself: derivative reflexive form (nonstandard; now chiefly used instead of "himself or herself" as a reflexive epicenity for they in pronominal reference to a singular referent)

== History ==
Old English had a single third-person pronoun hē, which had both singular and plural forms, and they wasn't among them. In or about the start of the 13th century, they was imported from a Scandinavian source (Old Norse þeir, Old Danish, Old Swedish þer, þair), in which it was a masculine plural demonstrative pronoun. It comes from Proto-Germanic *thai, nominative plural pronoun, from PIE *to-, demonstrative pronoun. According to The Cambridge History of the English Language:

By Chaucer's time the th- form has been adopted in London for the subject case only, whereas the oblique cases remain in their native form (hem, here < OE heom, heora). At the same period (and indeed before), Scots texts, such as Barbour's Bruce, have the th- form in all cases.

The development in Middle English is shown in the following table. At the final stage, it had reached its modern form.

Three stages of they in Middle English
	I	II	III
Nominative	þei	þei	þei
Oblique	hem	hem	hem ~ þem
Genitive	her[e]	her[e] ~ þeir	þeir

== Singular they ==
Singular they is a use of they as an epicene (gender-neutral) pronoun for a singular referent. In this usage, they follows plural agreement rules (they are, not *they is), but the semantic reference is singular. Unlike plural they, singular they is only used for people. For this reason, it could be considered to have personal gender. Some people refuse to use the epicene pronoun they when referring to individuals on the basis that it is primarily a plural pronoun instead of a singular pronoun. However, the online edition of the Oxford English Dictionary records usage of they "referring to an individual generically or indefinitely", with examples dating from a1405–2019.

=== Word of the year ===
In December 2019, Merriam-Webster chose singular they as word of the year. The word was chosen because "English famously lacks a gender-neutral singular pronoun to correspond neatly with singular pronouns like everyone or someone, and as a consequence they has been used for this purpose for over 600 years."

== Syntax ==
=== Functions ===
They can appear as a subject, object, determiner or predicative complement. The reflexive form also appears as an adjunct.

- Subject: "They're there"; "them being there"; "their being there".
- Object: "I saw them"; "I directed her to them"; "They connect to themselves."
- Predicative complement: "In our attempt to fight evil, we have become them"; "They eventually felt they had become themselves."
- Dependent determiner: "I touched their car"; "them folks are helpful" (non-standard).
- Independent determiner: "This is theirs."
- Adjunct: "They did it themselves."

=== Dependents ===
Pronouns rarely take dependents, but it is possible for they to have many of the same kind of dependents as other noun phrases.

- Relative clause modifier: "they who arrive late".
- Determiner: "Sometimes, when you think, 'I will show them', the 'them' you end up showing is yourself."
- Adjective phrase modifier: "the real them".
- Adverb phrase external modifier: "not even them".

== Semantics ==
Plural they's referents can be anything, including persons, as long as it does not include the speaker (which would require we) or the addressee(s) (which would require you). Singular they can only refer to individual persons. Until the end of the 20th century, this was limited to those whose gender is unknown (e.g., "Someone's here. I wonder what they want"; "That person over there seems to be waving their hands at us.").

=== Generic ===
The pronoun they can also be used to refer to an unspecified group of people, as in "In Japan they drive on the left", or "They are putting in a new restaurant across the street." It often refers to the authorities or non-specific "powers that be", or to some perceived powerful group, sometimes sinister: "They don't want the public to know the whole truth."

== See also ==
- English personal pronouns
- Non-binary § Pronouns and titles
- Generic antecedents
- Object pronoun
- Possessive pronoun
- Spivak pronoun
- Subject pronoun
