= Personal pronouns in English =

Closed lexical category of the English language

The English personal pronouns are a subset of English pronouns taking various forms according to number, person, case and grammatical gender. Modern English has very little inflection of nouns or adjectives, to the point where some authors describe it as an analytic language, but the Modern English system of personal pronouns has preserved some of the inflectional complexity of Old English and Middle English.

== Forms ==
Unlike nouns which are not inflected for case except for possession (woman/woman's), (Note: As well as number (singular and plural), nouns normally inflect for case (plain case and possessive). Some authorities talk of a genitive case, the inflected word being the last word in a phrasal genitive construction; others regard the genitive marker as a clitic.) English personal pronouns have a number of forms, which are named according to their typical grammatical role in a sentence: (Note: Terminological note: Authorities use different terms for the inflectional (case) forms of the personal pronouns, such as the oblique-case form me, which is used as a direct object, indirect object, oblique object, or object of a preposition, as well as other uses. For instance, one standard work on English grammar, A Comprehensive Grammar of the English Language, uses the term objective case, while another, The Cambridge Grammar of the English Language, uses the term accusative case. Similarly, some use the term nominative for the form I, while others use the term subjective. It is stressed that case is here used to refer to an inflectional category, not the abstract case (the case roles) used in some formal grammars.)

- objective (accusative) case (me, us, etc.), used as the object of a verb, complement of a preposition, and the subject of a verb in some constructions (see § Case usage below). The same forms are also used as disjunctive pronouns.
- subjective (nominative) case (I, we, etc.), used as the subject of a verb (see also § Case usage below).
- reflexive form (myself, ourselves, etc.). This typically refers back to a noun or pronoun (its antecedent) within the same clause (for example, She cut herself). This form is also sometimes used optionally in a non-reflexive function, as a substitute for a non-reflexive pronoun (for example, For someone like myself, . . ., This article was written by Professor Smith and myself), though some style guides recommend avoiding such use. The same reflexive forms also are used as intensive pronouns (for example, She made the dress herself).

Possessive pronouns (mine, ours, etc.) replace the entity that was referred to previously (as in I prefer mine) or serve as predicate adjectives (as in this book is mine). For details see English possessive. As they are pronouns they cannot precede any noun.

=== Basic ===
The basic personal pronouns of modern English are shown in the table below.

Personal pronouns in standard Modern English
Person (gender)		Subject	Object	Dependent possessive (determiner)	Independent possessive	Reflexive
Singular
First		I	me	my	mine	myself
Second		you		your	yours	yourself
Informal (archaic)		thou	thee	thy	thine	thyself
Third	Masculine	he	him	his		himself
Third	Feminine	she	her		hers	herself
Third	Neuter	it		its		itself
Third	Epicene	they	them	their	theirs	themself
Plural
First		we	us	our	ours	ourselves
Second		you		your	yours	yourselves
Third		they	them	their	theirs	themselves

Other English pronouns which have distinct forms of the above types are the indefinite pronoun one, which has the reflexive oneself (the possessive form is written one's, like a regular English possessive); and the interrogative and relative pronoun who, which has the objective form whom (now confined mostly to formal English) and the possessive whose (which in its relative use can also serve as the possessive for which).

Note that singular they is morphosyntactically plural: it is used with a plural verb form, as in "they laugh" or "they are". See the singular they section for more information.

The archaic pronouns lost favor by the late eighteenth century in both England and its colonies as modern English progressed. Their use is rare except for quoting older texts, the liturgy of certain churches, and a few small religious communities.

=== Archaic and non-standard ===
Apart from the standard forms given above, English also has a number of non-standard, informal and archaic forms of personal pronouns. The archaic forms can be traced back to Middle English pronouns via Early Modern English.

- An archaic set of second-person singular pronouns are thou, thee, thy, thine, thyself. In Anglo-Saxon times (Old English), these were strictly second person singular. After the Norman Conquest in 1066, they began to be used as a familiar form, like French tu and German du. They passed out of general use between 1600 and 1800, although they (or variants of them) survive in some English and Scottish dialects, some Christian religious communities, and in many idioms. Together with older verb forms and second-person plural pronouns (e.g. ye), they are used frequently in some Christian church liturgy such as prayers, chants, songs, and Bible readings.

Person (gender)	Subject	Object	Dependent possessive (determiner)	Independent possessive	Reflexive
Singular
Second	thou	thee	thy	thine	thyself

- In archaic language, mine and thine may be used in place of my and thy when followed by a vowel sound.
- For the use of me instead of I, see I (pronoun) § Coordinative constructions
- An archaic form of plural you as a subject pronoun is ye. Some dialects now use ye in place of you, or as an apocopated or clitic form of you. See ye (pronoun).
- A non-standard variant of my (particularly in British dialects) is me. (This may have its origins in the fact that in Middle English, my before a consonant was pronounced [mi:], like modern English me, (while me was [me:], similar to modern may) and this was shortened to [mi] or [mɪ], as the pronouns he and we are nowadays: hi wɒz he was; versus ɪt wɒz hi: it was he. As this vowel was short, it was not subject to the Great Vowel Shift, and so emerged in modern English unchanged.)
- Informal second-person plural forms (particularly in North American dialects) are often regional and non-standard. They include you all, y'all, youse. Other variants include: yous, you/youse guys, you/youse gals, you-uns, yis, yinz. Possessives may include you(r) guys's, you(r) gals's, yous's, y'all's (or y'alls). Reflexives may be formed by adding selves after any of the possessive forms. Yous is common in Scotland, particularly in the Central Belt area (though in some parts of the country and in parts of Ireland, ye is used for the plural you).
- In informal speech them is often replaced by 'em, believed to be a survival of the late Old English form heom, which appears as hem in Chaucer, losing its aspiration due to being used as an unstressed form. (The forms they, them etc. are of Scandinavian origin.)
- Non-standard reflexive forms ourself and themself are sometimes used in contexts where we and they are used with singular meaning (see singular they).
- Non-standard reflexive forms hisself and theirselves/theirself are sometimes used (though would be considered incorrect in standard English).
- In some parts of England, the pronoun "hoo" is used as a third person singular pronoun. The exact usage varies by location, as it can refer to a male creature, female creature, or be used as a genderless pronoun depending on where in England it is used.
- A change from first person singular to plural is used in the royal we.
- A change from second person singular to first person plural is sometimes used colloquially, but may be perceived as patronizing: "Are we ready for our dinner?" meaning "Are you ready for your dinner?"

=== Complete table ===
A more complete table, including the standard forms and some of the above forms, is given below. Nonstandard, informal and archaic forms are in italics.

			Subject	Object	Dependent possessive	Independent possessive	Reflexive
First-person	Singular		I	me	my mine (before vowel) me (esp. BrE)	mine	myself
First-person	Plural		we	us	our	ours	ourselves ourself
Second-person	Singular	Standard (archaic plural and later formal)	you (Note: In religious usage, these pronouns are often capitalized when referring to a deity: He/She/You, Him/Her/You, His/Her/Your, and Himself/Herself/Yourself)		your	yours	yourself
Second-person	Singular	Archaic informal	thou	thee	thy thine (before vowel)	thine	thyself
Second-person	Plural	Standard	you		your	yours	yourselves
Second-person	Plural	Archaic	ye	you	your	yours	yourselves
Second-person	Plural	Nonstandard	ye you all y'all youse etc. (see above)		yeer y'all's (or y'alls)	yeers y'all's (or y'alls)	yeerselves y'all's (or y'alls) selves
Third-person	Singular	Masculine	he	him	his		himself
Third-person	Singular	Feminine	she	her		hers	herself
Third-person	Singular	Neuter	it		its	its	itself
Third-person	Singular	Epicene (see singular they)	they	them	their	theirs	themselves themself
Third-person	Plural		they	them	their	theirs	themselves
Generic	Formal		one		one's	(unattested)	oneself
Generic	Informal		you		your		yourself

For further archaic forms, and information on the evolution of the personal pronouns of English, see Old English pronouns.

== Generic you ==
The pronoun you (and its other forms) can be used as a generic or indefinite pronoun, referring to a person in general. A more formal equivalent is the indefinite pronoun one (reflexive oneself, possessive one's). For example, you should keep your secrets to yourself may be used in place of the more formal one should keep one's secrets to oneself.

== Gender ==
=== Use of he, she and it ===
The feminine pronouns she, her, and hers are used to refer to female persons. The masculine pronouns, he, him, and his are used to refer to male persons. It and its are normally used to refer to an inanimate object or abstract concept; however, babies and young children may sometimes be referred to as it (e.g. a child needs its mother). Outside of these very limited contexts, use of it as a pronoun for people is generally avoided, due to the feeling that it is dehumanizing.

Traditionally, in English, if the gender of a person was not known or ambiguous, then the masculine pronouns were often used by default (e.g. a good student always does his homework). Increasingly, though, singular they is used in such cases (see below).

Animals are often referred to as it, but he and she are sometimes used for animals when the animal's sex is known and is of interest, particularly for higher animals, especially pets and other domesticated animals. Inanimate objects with which humans have a close relationship, such as ships, cars and countries considered as political, rather than geographical, entities, are sometimes referred to using feminine pronouns such as she and her. This may also be extended to other entities, such as towns.

=== Singular they ===
The singular they emerged by the 14th century, about a century after the plural they. Even when used with singular meaning, they takes a plural verb: If attacked, the victim should remain exactly where they are. Due to this supposed grammatical inconsistency, use of singular they was discouraged by some grammarians during the nineteenth and twentieth centuries in favor of using generic he. Since the 1970s, however, this trend has reversed, and singular they now enjoys widespread acceptance.

In the early 21st century, use of singular they with known individuals emerged for some non-binary people, or when the sex or social gender of a person is unknown or unspecified. This is a way of producing gender-neutral language while avoiding other pronouns like he or she, he/she, or s/he.

=== Gender agreement of genitives ===
In English, genitive pronouns agree with the gender of the antecedent or referent. This is in contrast to many languages in which such pronouns agree with the gender of the head noun of the NP in which they appear. For example, in She saw her brother, the genitive pronoun her agrees with antecedent she. Both are feminine. In Italian, in contrast, the same sentences is Lei ha visto suo fratello. Here suo is a third-person, singular, masculine genitive pronoun. It agrees with fratello (brother), not with the feminine antecedent lei.

== Case usage ==
As noted above, most of the personal pronouns have distinct case forms – a subjective (nominative) form and an objective (oblique, accusative) form. In certain instances variation arises in the use of these forms.

As a general rule, the subjective form is used when the pronoun is the subject of a verb, as in he kicked the ball, whereas the objective form is used as the direct or indirect object of a verb, or the object (complement) of a preposition. For example: Sue kicked him, someone gave him the ball, Mary was with him.

When used as a predicative expression, i.e. as the complement of a form of the copula verb be, the subjective form was traditionally regarded as more correct (as in this is I, it was he), but nowadays the objective form is used predominantly (this is me, it was him), and the use of the subjective in such instances is normally regarded as very formal or pedantic; it is more likely (in formal English) when followed by a relative clause (it is we who sent them to die). In some cases the subjective may even appear ungrammatical, as in *is that we in the photograph? (where us would be expected).

When a pronoun is linked to other nouns or pronouns by a coordinating conjunction such as and or or, traditional grammar prescribes that the pronoun should appear in the same form as it would take if it were used alone in the same position: Jay and I will arrive later (since I is used for the subject of a verb), but between you and me (since me is used for the object of a preposition). However, in informal and less careful usage this rule may not be consistently followed; it is common to hear Jay and me will arrive... and between you and I. The latter type (use of the subjective form in object position) is seen as an example of hypercorrection, resulting from an awareness that many instances of and me (like that in the first example) are considered to require correction to and I.

Similar deviations from the grammatical norm are quite common in other examples where the pronoun does not stand alone as the subject or object, as in Who said us Yorkshiremen [grammatical: we Yorkshiremen] are tight?

When a pronoun stands alone without an explicit verb or preposition, the objective form is commonly used, even when traditional grammarians might prefer the subjective: Who's sitting here? Me. (Here I might be regarded as grammatically correct, since it is short for I am (sitting here), but it would sound formal and pedantic, unless followed by am.)

A particular case of this type occurs when a pronoun stands alone following the word than. Here the objective form is again predominant in informal usage (they are older than us), as would be expected if than were analyzed as a preposition. However traditionally than is considered a conjunction, and so in formal and grammatically careful English the pronoun often takes the form that would appear if than were followed by a clause: they are older than we (by analogy with ...than we are), but she likes him better than me (if the intended meaning is "...than she likes me").

For more examples of some of these points, see Disjunctive pronoun.

== See also ==
- Generic antecedents
- Gender-specific and gender-neutral pronouns
- Inanimate whose
- One (pronoun)
- Who (pronoun)
- Reverential capitalization
- Wiktionary table of personal pronouns
- Wiktionary list of English pronouns (comprehensive)
