= Medulla =

Medulla (Latin for "marrow") or medullary may refer to:

== Science ==
- Medulla oblongata, a part of the brain stem
- Renal medulla, a part of the kidney
- Adrenal medulla, a part of the adrenal gland
- Medulla of ovary, a stroma in the center of the ovary
- Medulla of the thymus, a part of the lobes of the thymus
- Medulla of lymph node
- Medulla (hair), the innermost layer of the hair shaft
- Medulla, a part of the optic lobe of arthropods
- Medulla (lichenology), a layer of the internal structure of a lichen
- Pith, or medulla, a tissue in the stems of vascular plants

== Other uses ==
- Medúlla, a 2004 album by Björk
- Medulla, Florida, a place in the U.S.
- Las Médulas, a gold mining site in León, Spain

== See also ==
- Medullary cavity, the central cavity of bone shafts
- Medullary ray (disambiguation)
- Medulla Grammatice, a fifteenth-century Latin–Middle English glossary
