= Disjunctive pronoun =

Stressed form of a personal pronoun

A disjunctive pronoun is a stressed form of a personal pronoun reserved for use in isolation or in certain syntactic contexts.

In Modern English, this function is fulfilled by the object pronouns (me, you, him, her, us, them) when used in stressed or isolated positions (e.g., “Me.”) or after linking verbs (e.g., “It is me.”).

== Examples and usage ==
Disjunctive pronominal forms are typically found in the following contexts. The examples are taken from French, which uses the disjunctive first person singular pronoun moi. The (sometimes colloquial) English translations illustrate similar uses of me as a disjunctive form.

- in syntactically unintegrated disjunct (or "dislocated") positions

Les autres s'en vont, mais moi, je reste.

The others are leaving, but me, I'm staying.

- in elliptical constructions (often "sentence fragments") with no verb (e.g. short answers)

Qui veut du gâteau ? Moi.

Who wants cake? Me. (cf. "I do")

Il est plus âgé que moi.

He is older than me. (cf. "I am")

- in the main clause of a cleft sentence

C'est moi que vous cherchez.

It's me that you're looking for.

== "It's me" ==
In some languages, a personal pronoun has a form called a disjunctive pronoun, which is used when it stands on its own, or with only a copula, such as in answering the question "Who wrote this page?" The natural answer for most English speakers in this context would be "me" (or "It's me"), parallel to moi (or C'est moi) in French. Unlike in French, however, where such constructions are considered standard, English pronouns used in this way have caused dispute. Some grammarians contend that the correct answer should be "I" or "It is I" because "is" is a linking verb and "I" is a predicate nominative, and up until a few centuries ago spoken English used pronouns in the subjective case in such sentences. However, since English has lost noun inflection and now relies on word order, using the objective case me after the verb be like other verbs seems natural to modern speakers.

Historical evidence shows that the use of object pronouns as disjunctive forms has been common since the beginning of Modern English. Early authors, including William Shakespeare, employed “me” after the copular verb in exactly this way—for example, “Oh, the dog is me, and I am myself” (The Two Gentlemen of Verona, Act 2, Scene 3). Such attestations indicate that “me” in constructions like “It is me” has long-standing precedent in English, challenging the prescriptive claim that only “It is I” is grammatically correct.

"It is I" developed from the Old and Middle English form "It am I" (similar to "Who am I?", not "Who is me?"). In that earlier construction, "it" was used as the complement of "am", but in Modern English "it" is the subject, which explains why speakers naturally use object pronouns (such as me, him, her, us or them) after the verb in this position.

== See also ==
- English personal pronouns
- French personal pronouns
- Intensive pronoun
- Irish morphology §§ Disjunctive forms and Disjunctive numbers
- Subjective pronoun
- Weak pronoun
- Copula
