= You =

Personal pronoun to denote the interlocutor

In Modern English, the word "you" is the second-person pronoun. It is grammatically plural, and was historically used only for the dative case, but in most modern dialects is used for all cases and numbers.

== History ==
You comes from the Proto-Germanic demonstrative base *juz-, *iwwiz from Proto-Indo-European *yu- (second-person plural pronoun). Old English had singular, dual, and plural second-person pronouns. The dual form was lost by the 12th century, and the singular form was lost by the early 1600s. The development is shown in the following table.

Second-person pronouns in Old, Middle and Modern English
	Singular			Dual			Plural		
	OE	ME	Mod	OE	ME	Mod	OE	ME	Mod
Nominative	þu	þu	—N/a	ġit	—N/a		ġe	ȝē	you
Accusative	þe	þē	—N/a	inc	—N/a		ēow	ȝou	you
Dative	þe	þē	—N/a	inc	—N/a		ēow	ȝou	you
Genitive	þīn	þī(n)	—N/a	incer	—N/a		ēower	ȝour(es)	your(s)

Early Modern English distinguished between the plural ye and the singular thou. As in many other European languages, English at the time had a T–V distinction, which made the plural forms more respectful and deferential; they were used to address strangers and social superiors. This distinction ultimately led to familiar thou becoming obsolete in modern English, although it persists in some English dialects.

Yourself had developed by the early 14th century, with the plural yourselves attested from 1520.

== Morphology ==
In Standard Modern English, you has five shapes representing six distinct word forms:

- you: the nominative (subjective) and accusative (objective or oblique case) forms
- your: the dependent genitive (possessive) form
- yours: the independent genitive (possessive) form
- yourselves: the plural reflexive and intensive (emphatic) form
- yourself: the singular reflexive and intensive (emphatic) form

=== Plural forms from other varieties ===
Although there is some dialectal retention of the original plural ye and the original singular thou, most English-speaking groups have lost the original forms. Because of the loss of the original singular-plural distinction, many English dialects belonging to this group have innovated new plural forms of the second person pronoun. Examples of such pronouns sometimes seen and heard include:

- y'all, or you all – southern United States, African-American Vernacular English, the Abaco Islands, St. Helena and Tristan da Cunha. Y'all however, is also occasionally used for the second-person singular in the North American varieties.
- you guys – United States, particularly in the Midwest, Northeast, South Florida and West Coast; Canada, Australia. Gendered usage varies; for mixed groups, "you guys" is nearly always used. For groups consisting of only women, forms like "you girls" or "you gals" might appear instead, though "you guys" is sometimes used for a group of only women as well.
- you lot – United Kingdom, Australia
- you mob – Australia
- you-all, all-you – Caribbean English, Saba
- a(ll)-yo-dis – Guyana
- allyuh – Trinidad and Tobago
- among(st)-you – Carriacou, Grenada, Guyana, Utila
- wunna – Barbados
- yinna – Bahamas
- unu/oona – Jamaica, Belize, Cayman Islands, Barbados, San Salvador Island
- yous(e) – Ireland, Tyneside, Merseyside, Central Scotland, Australia, Falkland Islands, New Zealand, Philadelphia, parts of the Midwestern US, Cape Breton and rural Canada
- yous(e) guys – in the United States, particularly in New York City region, Philadelphia, Northeastern Pennsylvania, and the Upper Peninsula of Michigan;
- you-uns, or yinz – Western Pennsylvania, the Ozarks, the Appalachians
- ye, yee, yees, yiz – Ireland, Tyneside, Newfoundland and Labrador

In the United States, "youse" may have an uneducated connotation for some listeners. This caused "you guys" to displace "youse" in many regions. In regions where "youse" is still used, it may be preferred for being gender neutral. Among Midwesterners, "youse guys" might be preferred for larger groups.

== Semantics ==
You prototypically refers to the addressee along with zero or more other persons, excluding the speaker. You is also used to refer to personified things (e.g., why won't you start? addressed to a car). You is always definite even when it is not specific.

Semantically, you is both singular and plural, though syntactically it is almost always plural: i.e. always takes a verb form that originally marked the word as plural, (i.e. you are, in common with we are and they are).

=== First person usage ===
The practice of referring to oneself as you, occasionally known as tuism, is common when talking to oneself. It is less common in conversations with others, as it could easily result in confusion. Since English lacks a distinct first person singular imperative mood, you and let's function as substitutes.

=== Third person usage ===
You is used to refer to an indeterminate person, as a more common alternative to the formal indefinite pronoun one.

Though this usage may be semantically third person, verbs always agree with indefinite you in the usual form. Examples:

You should drink water more frequently (for One (or We) should drink water more frequently)
You never know how it might turn out (for One never knows it might turn out; never said as *You never knows …)

== Syntax ==
=== Agreement ===
You almost always triggers plural verb agreement, even when it is semantically singular.

=== Functions ===
You can appear as a subject, object, determiner or predicative complement. The reflexive form also appears as an adjunct. You occasionally appears as a modifier in a noun phrase.

- Subject: You're there; your being there; you paid for yourself to be there.
- Object: I saw you; I introduced her to you; You saw yourself.
- Predicative complement: The only person there was you; this is yours.
- Determiner: I met your friend.
- Adjunct: You did it yourself.
- Modifier: This sounds like a you problem.

=== Dependents ===
Pronouns rarely take dependents, but it is possible for you to have many of the same kind of dependents as other noun phrases.

- Relative clause modifier: you who believe
- Determiner: the real you, but not *the you
- Adjective phrase modifier: the real you, but not *real you
- Adverb phrase external modifier: Not even you

== See also ==
- Generic you
- English personal pronouns
- Thou
- Y'all
- Yinz
