= Possessive antecedent =

Concept in English grammar

In English grammar, a pronoun has a possessive antecedent if its antecedent (the noun that it refers to) appears in the possessive case; for example, in the following sentence, Winston Churchill is a possessive antecedent, serving as it does as the antecedent for the pronoun him:

Winston Churchill's history shows him to have been a good writer.

In the 1960s, some usage guides started to reject the use of possessive antecedents. These guides argue that a pronoun's antecedent cannot be a noun in a possessive construct; in this case, they contend that Winston Churchill, embedded as it is in the construct Winston Churchill's, cannot serve as the antecedent for the pronoun him. The basis for this contention is that a pronoun's antecedent must be a noun, so that if Winston Churchill's is an adjective, then a pronoun cannot refer back to it. This rule does not reflect ordinary English usage, and it is commonly ignored (intentionally or otherwise) even by those who have heard of it.

== See also ==
- Origo (pragmatics)
- Deixis
