= Y'all =

Contraction of you and all

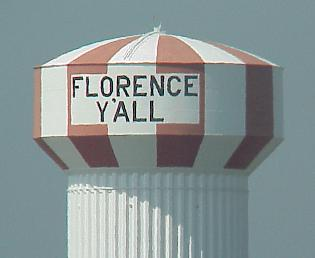
The Florence Y'all Water Tower in Florence, Kentucky; the words were painted in 1974.

Y'all (pronounced /jɔːl/ yawl) is a contraction of you all, sometimes combined as you-all. Y'all is the main second-person plural pronoun in Southern American English, with which it is most frequently associated, though it also appears in some other English varieties, including African-American English, South African Indian English and Sri Lankan English. It is usually used as a plural second-person pronoun, but whether it is exclusively plural is a perennial subject of discussion.

== History ==
Y'all is a contraction of you all. The spelling you-all in second-person plural pronoun usage was first recorded in 1824. The earliest two attestations with the actual spelling y'all are from 1856, and in the Southern Literary Messenger (published in Richmond, Virginia) in 1858. Although it appeared in print sporadically in the second half of the 19th century in the Southern United States, its usage did not accelerate as a whole Southern regional phenomenon until the 20th century.

It is not certain whether its use began specifically with Black or White residents of the South, both of whom use the term today; one possibility is that the term was brought by Scots-Irish immigrants to the South, evolving from the earlier Ulster Scots term ye aw. An alternative theory is that y'all is a calque of Gullah and Caribbean creole via earlier dialects of African-American English. However, most linguists agree that y'all is likely an original form in the United States, deriving from gradual processes of grammar and morphological change, rather than being directly transferred from any other English dialects.

Y'all appeared at different times in various dialects of English, including Southern American English and South African Indian English, suggesting parallel, independent development, while emergence in Southern and African-American Vernacular English closely correlates in time and place.

The spelling y'all is the most prevalent in print, 10 times that of ya'll; much less common spelling variants include yall, yawl, and yo-all.

== Linguistic characteristics ==
Functionally, the emergence of y'all can be traced to the merging of singular ("thou") and plural ("ye") second-person pronouns in Early Modern English. Y'all thus fills in the gap created by the absence of a separate second-person plural pronoun in standard modern English. Y'all is unique in that the stressed form that it contracts (you-all) is converted to an unstressed form.

The usage of y'all can satisfy several grammatical functions, including an associative plural, a collective pronoun, an institutional pronoun, and an indefinite pronoun.

Y'all can in some instances serve as a "tone-setting device to express familiarity and solidarity." When used in the singular, y'all can be used to convey a feeling of warmth towards the addressee. In this way, singular usage of y'all differs from French, Russian or German, where plural forms can be used for formal singular instances.

=== Singular usage ===
There is historic disagreement whether y'all is primarily or exclusively plural, with debate steming from the late 19th century to the present. While some Southerners hold that y'all is only properly used as a plural pronoun, counter evidence suggests usage include singular references, particularly amongst non-Southerners.

H. L. Mencken, in recognizing the typical plural reference of y'all or you-all, acknowledged occasional observation of the singular reference, writing that the exclusive plural usage of y'all

is a cardinal article of faith in the South. ... Nevertheless, it has been questioned very often, and with a considerable showing of evidence. Ninety-nine times out of a hundred, to be sure, you-all indicates a plural, implicit if not explicit, and thus means, when addressed to a single person, 'you and your folks' or the like, but the hundredth time it is impossible to discover any such extension of meaning.

— H. L. Mencken, The American Language Supplement 2: An Inquiry into the Development of English in the United States, 1948, p. 337

=== Possessive forms ===
The existence of the genitive (or possessive) form y'all's indicates that y'all functions as a pronoun as opposed to a phrasal element. The possessive form of y'all has not been standardized; numerous forms can be found, including y'alls, y'alls's, you all's, your all's, and all of y'all's.

=== All y'all ===
All y'all, all of y'all, and alls y'all are used by some speakers to indicate a larger group than is necessarily implied by simply y'all. All y'all can also be used for emphasis; the existence of this etymologically pleonastic form is further evidence that speakers now perceive y'all as a grammatically indivisible unit.

== Regional usage ==
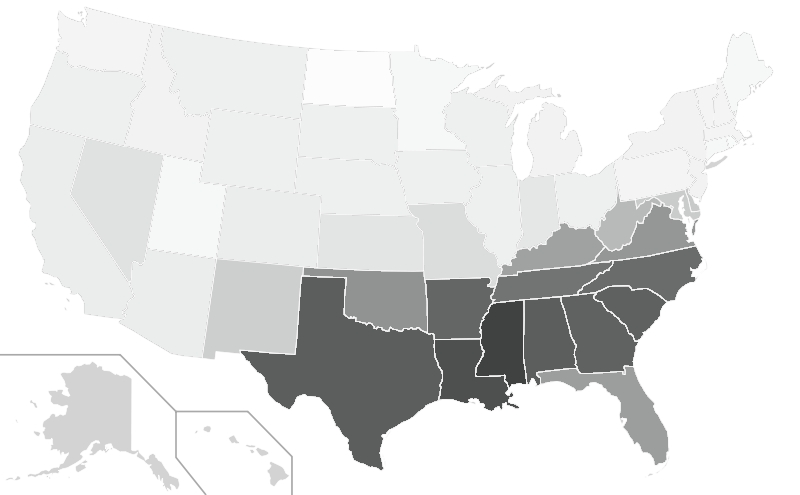
Frequency of "y'all" to address a group of two or more people, according to a 2011 survey of American dialect variation

=== United States ===
Y'all has been called "perhaps the most distinctive of all grammatical characteristics" of Southern American English. Linguist Walt Wolfram and English professor Jeffrey Reaser wrote, "No word in the American English vocabulary probably carries as much regional capital." People who move to the South from other regions often adopt the usage, even when other regional usages are not adopted. Outside the southern United States, y'all is most closely associated with African-American Vernacular English. African Americans took Southern usages with them during the 20th-century exodus from the South to cities in the northeastern United States and other places within the nation. In urban African-American communities outside of the South, the usage of y'all is prominent.

The use of y'all as the dominant second person-plural pronoun is not necessarily universal in the southern United States. In some dialects of the Ozarks and Great Smoky Mountains, for example, it is common to hear you'uns (a contraction of "you ones") used instead. In the Missouri Ozarks (and adjoining regions of the state), "you-all" is the preferred form, though “all y’all” may be indicated, depending upon context. Other forms have also been used increasingly in the South, including you guys.

A survey conducted in 1996 reported 49% of non-Southerners and 84% of Southerners used y'all or you-all in conversation, with a 1994 survey returning a 5% increase by both groups.

=== South Africa ===
In South Africa, y'all appears across all varieties of South African Indian English. Its lexical similarity to the y'all of the United States may be coincidental.

=== Rest of the world ===
Y'all appears in other dialects of English, including Sri Lankan English and dialects of St. Helena, Tristan da Cunha, and Newfoundland and Labrador, where it competes with ye or "ye all" or "all of ye".

== See also ==
- English personal pronouns
- You § Plural forms
  - Ye (pronoun)
  - Yinz
