= Subject pronoun =

Personal pronoun that is used as the subject of a verb

In linguistics, a subject pronoun is a personal pronoun that is used as the subject of a verb. Subject pronouns are usually in the nominative case for languages with a nominative–accusative alignment pattern. On the other hand, a language with an ergative-absolutive pattern usually has separate subject pronouns for transitive and intransitive verbs: an ergative case pronoun for transitive verbs and an absolutive case pronoun for intransitive verbs.

In English, the commonly used subject pronouns are I, you, he, she, it, one, we, they, who and what. With the exception of you, it, one and what, and in informal speech who, the object pronouns are different: i.e. me, him, her, us, them and whom (see English personal pronouns).

In some cases, the subject pronoun is not used for the logical subject. For example, exceptional case marking (ECM) constructions involve the subject of a non-finite clause which appears in the object form (e.g., I want him to go.) In colloquial speech, a coordinated first person subject will often appear in the object form even in subject position (e.g., Me and James went to the store.) This is corrected so often that it has led to cases of hypercorrection, where the subject pronoun is used even in object position under coordination (e.g., Marie gave Susana and I a piece of cake.)

== See also ==
- Disjunctive pronoun
- Object pronoun
- Subject complement
- Subject (grammar)
