= Medieval English Poetry: The Non-Chaucerian Tradition =

1958 nonfiction book by John Spiers

- Book jacket image
- Author: John Spiers
- Language: English
- Subject: English poetry, History and criticism, Middle English, Middle English Romances
- Genre: Literary Criticism, interpretation
- Set in: Middle ages 1100-1500
- Published: 1957
- Publisher: Faber & Faber
- Media type: Print
- Pages: 400+
- ISBN: 9780571067381 9780571096176
- OCLC: 3377169
- Website: Official website

Medieval English Poetry: The Non-Chaucerian Tradition is nonfiction book by John Spiers that is designed to make accessible, Middle English poetry for the modern reader and literary critic (c.1960s). This book was originally published in 1957 by Faber & Faber
