= Multi-word verb =

Verb that consists of more than one word

Multi-word verbs are verbs that consist of more than one word. This term may cover both periphrasis as in combinations involving modal or semi-modal auxiliaries with an additional verbal or other lexeme, e.g. had better, used to, be going to, ought to, phrasal verbs, as in combinations of verbs and particles, and compound verbs as in light-verb constructions, e.g. take a shower, have a meal.
