= Medullary ray =

Medullary ray may refer to:

- Medullary ray (anatomy), the middle part of the Cortical lobule
- Medullary ray (botany), characteristic radial sheets or ribbons extending vertically, found in woods
