= Medulla Grammatice =

Collection of Latin-Middle English glossaries

Medulla Grammatice or Medulla Grammaticae ("the Marrow of Grammar") is a collection of fifteenth century Latin–Middle English glossaries in the British Museum and elsewhere. The Medulla Grammatice, has been transmitted through 19 manuscripts and four fragments (others we know to have been lost). Essentially the Medulla was found in most of the major centres of learning in England. The time period was the 15th century, early to late, with only one manuscript internally dated: St. John's (Cambridge), 16 December 1468.
