= Ye olde =

Pseudo-Early Modern English phrase

Anachronistic sign reading "Ye Olde Pizza Parlor"

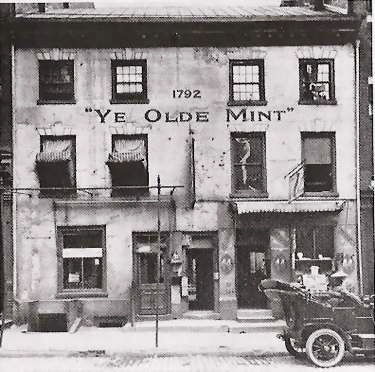
The first Philadelphia Mint, as it appeared around 1908

Ye olde is a pseudo-Early Modern English phrase originally used to suggest a connection between a place or business and Merry England (or the medieval period). The term dates to 1896 or earlier; it continues to be used today, albeit now more frequently in an ironically anachronistic and kitsch fashion.

== History ==
"... by the grace that God put ..." (Extract from The Book of Margery Kempe)

The use of the term ye to mean "the" derives from Early Modern English, in which the was written þe, employing the Old English letter thorn, ⟨þ⟩. During the Tudor period, the scribal abbreviation for þe was þͤ or þᵉ ; here, the letter ⟨þ⟩ is combined with the letter ⟨e⟩. With the arrival of movable type printing, the substitution of the similar ⟨y⟩ for ⟨Þ⟩ became ubiquitous, leading to the common ye as in "Ye Olde Curiositie Shoppe". A different connection, the one that survived, arose from the letter thorn being finally discontinued (in English orthography (Note: its use persists in Icelandic)) in favour of the digraph ⟨th⟩. Today, ye when it means "the" is often incorrectly pronounced as though it were the archaic second person plural pronoun of the same spelling.

== See also ==
- Mojibake – Garbled text as a result of incorrect character encodings
- Olde English District – District of South Carolina, US
- Sensational spelling – Non-standard spelling for effect
