= Yinz =

Second person pronoun used in Pennsylvania

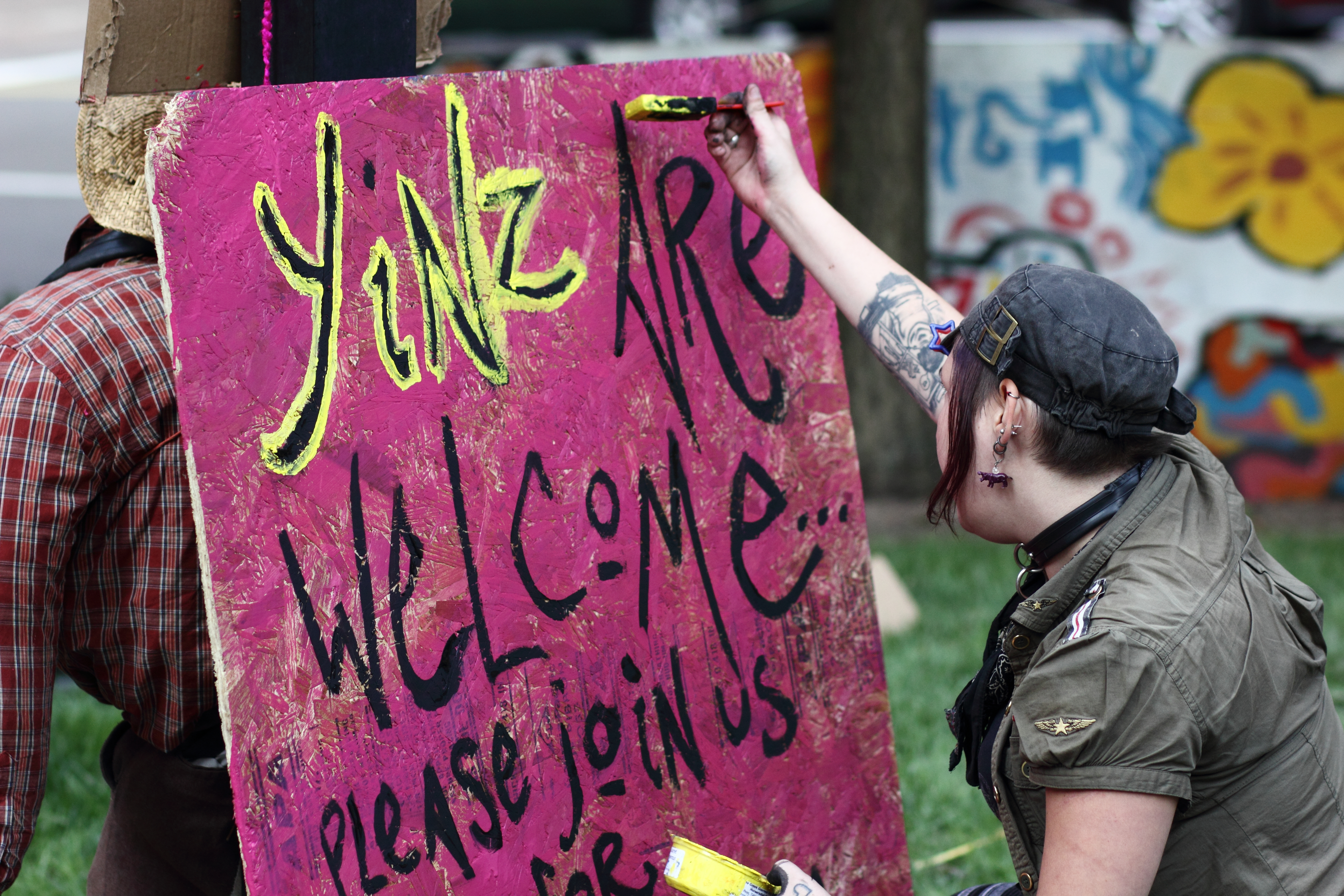
"Yinz Are Welcome" sign at Occupy Pittsburgh in 2011

Yinz (see § History and usage below for other spellings) is a second-person plural pronoun used mainly in Western Pennsylvania English. It is most prominent in Pittsburgh, but it is also found throughout the cultural region known as Appalachia, located within the geographical region of the Appalachians.

== History and usage ==
Yinz is a derivation from the original Scots-Irish forms "Yin(s)" (meaning 'One(s)) and related contractions of you ones, yous ones and ye 'uns, a form of the second-person plural that is commonly heard in Scotland, Ulster and parts of Ireland and Northern England. In the first and third person, standard English-speakers use distinct pronouns to denote singular and plural. In the first person, for example, speakers use the singular I and the plural we. However, the second-person pronoun you performs a double duty since it is both the singular form and the plural form. Crozier (1984) suggests that during the 19th century, when many Irish-speakers switched to speaking English, they filled that gap with you ones, primarily because Irish has both the singular second-person pronoun tú and the plural form sibh. The following, therefore, is the most likely path from you ones to yinz: you ones [juː wʌnz] > you'uns [juːʌnz] > youns [juːnz] > yunz [jʌnz] > yinz [jɪ̈nz]. Because there are still speakers who use each form, there is no stable second-person plural pronoun form in the southwest or central Pennsylvania area, so the pronoun is variably referred to or spelled as you'uns, y'ins, y'uns, yunz, yuns, yinz, yenz, yins, or ynz.

In other parts of the United States, similarly regional British, Irish and Scots-Irish speakers brought over different dialectal second-person plural forms. Examples include yunz, which is used in and around Middletown, Pennsylvania; youse, which is found mainly in New York City and Chicago, the Philadelphia dialect and New Jersey; and y'all, which is ubiquitous in the South.

A similar form with similar Irish and Scots roots is found in the Atlantic Provinces of Canada. Rarely written, it is spelled yous and is usually pronounced as [jɪ̈z] or something between [jɪ̈z] and [jʊ̈z]. It is sometimes combined with all for emphasis, as in, "are yous all coming to the party?" That usage is also common within Carbon and Schuylkill Counties, Pennsylvania.

== In popular culture ==
Being one of Pennsylvania's most famous regionalisms makes yinz a badge of pride. For example, a group of Pittsburgh-area radical cheerleaders call themselves "Yinz Cheer", and an area literary magazine was called The New Yinzer, a take-off of The New Yorker. Those perceived to be stereotypical blue-collar Pittsburgh residents are often referred to as Yinzers.

Yinztagram is a software program with a Pittsburgh theme.

YinzCam is a Pittsburgh-based software development company.

At the end of every episode of VH-1's Top 20 Countdown, host Jim Shearer always says "I'm Jim Shearer, and I'll see yinz later."

In the TV series One Dollar (2018), set in a rust belt town (shot in and around Pittsburgh), the Yinz address is frequently used.

Waypoint YINZZ in Newell, West Virginia is often used by aircraft arriving into Pittsburgh International Airport on the JESEY FIVE route.

The second season episode "Happy When It Rains" of the TV series Watson features a running joke throughout the episode in which the character Shinwell Johnson is continuously confounded by the word "yinz" and what it means.

== See also ==
- Ye (pronoun)
- You § Plural forms from other varieties
