= I (pronoun) =

First-person singular personal pronoun

In Modern English, I is the singular, first-person pronoun.

== Morphology ==
In Standard Modern English, I has five distinct word forms:

- I: the nominative (subjective) (Note: Terminological note: Authorities use different terms for the inflectional (case) forms of the personal pronouns, such as the oblique-case form me, which is used as a direct object, indirect object, or object of a preposition, as well as other uses. For instance, one standard work on English grammar, A Comprehensive Grammar of the English Language, uses the term objective case, while another, The Cambridge Grammar of the English Language, uses the term accusative case. Similarly, some use the term nominative for the form I, while others use the term subjective. Some authorities use the term genitive for forms such as my where others use the term possessive. Some grammars refer to my and mine, respectively, as the dependent genitive and the independent genitive, while others call my a possessive adjective and mine a possessive pronoun.) form
  - I is the only pronoun form that is always capitalized in English. (Note: Other pronouns may be capitalized when referring to the Deity ("God's in His heaven") and, of course, when beginning a sentence. The capitalization of the first person pronoun is distinctive of English, although it is common in other languages to capitalize a second person pronoun, for example Sie in German and Anda in Indonesian.) This practice became established in the late 15th century, though lowercase i was sometimes found as late as the 17th century.
- me: the accusative (objective, also called 'oblique') form
- my: the dependent genitive (possessive) form
- mine: the independent genitive (possessive) form
- myself: the reflexive form

== History ==
Old English had a first-person pronoun that inflected for four cases and three numbers. I originates from Old English (OE) ic, which had in turn originated from the continuation of Proto-Germanic *ik, and ek; the asterisk denotes an unattested form, but ek was attested in the Elder Futhark inscriptions (in some cases notably showing the variant eka; see also ek erilaz). Linguists assume ik to have developed from the unstressed variant of ek. Variants of ic were used in various English dialects up until the 1600s. The Proto-Germanic root came, in turn, from the Proto Indo-European language (PIE) *eg-.

Old and Middle English first-person pronouns (Note: Early OE, late OE, and ME)
	Singular			Dual			Plural		
	Early OE (Note: c. 700 CE)	Late OE	ME	Early	Late	ME	Early	Late	ME
Nominative	iċ	ic	I	wit	wit	—N/a	we	wē	wē
Accusative	meċ	mē	mē	uncit	unc	—N/a	usiċ	ūs	us
Dative	me	mē	mē	unc	unc	—N/a	ūs	ūs	us
Genitive	mīn	mīn	mī(n)	uncer	uncer	—N/a	ūser	ūre	our(es)

Old English me and mec are from Proto-Germanic *meke (accusative) and *mes (dative). Mine is from Proto-Germanic *minaz, and my is a reduced form of mine. All of these are from PIE root *me-.

== Syntax ==
=== Functions ===
I can appear as a subject, object, determiner, or predicative complement. The reflexive form also appears as an adjunct. Me occasionally appears as a modifier in a noun phrase.

- Subject: I'm here; me being here; my being there; I paid for myself to be here.
- Object: She saw me; She introduced him to me; He gave me the book; I saw myself in the mirror; It was a picture of me.
- Predicative complement: The only person there was me / I; I made her mine.
- Determiner: I met my friend.
- Adjunct: I fixed the problem myself.
- Modifier: the me generation

==== Coordinative constructions ====
The above applies when the pronoun stands alone as the subject or object. In some varieties of English (particularly in formal registers), those rules also apply in coordinative constructions such as "you and I".

- "My husband and I wish you a merry Christmas."
- "Between you and me..."

In many dialects of informal English, the accusative is sometimes used when the pronoun is part of a coordinative subject construction, as in

- "Phil and me wish you a merry Christmas."

This is stigmatized but common in many dialects.

=== Dependents ===
Pronouns rarely take dependents, but it is possible for me to have many of the same kind of dependents as other noun phrases.

- Relative clause modifier: the me I'd like to be; *me I'd like to be
- Determiner: the me I'd like to be; *the me
- Adjective phrase modifier: the real me
- Adverb phrase external modifier: Not even me

== Semantics ==
I's referents are limited to the individual person speaking or writing, the first person. I is always definite and specific.

== Pronunciation ==
According to the OED, the following pronunciations are used:

Form	Plain	Unstressed	Recording
I	(UK) /ʌɪ/ (US) /aɪ/		female speaker with UK accent
me	(UK) /miː/ (US) /mi/	/mi/, /mɪ/ /mɪ/	female speaker with US accent
my	(UK) /mʌɪ/ (US) /maɪ/		female speaker with US accent
mine	(UK) /mʌɪn/ (US) /maɪn/		female speaker with US accent
myself	(UK) /mʌɪˈsɛlf/ (US) /maɪˈsɛlf/	/mᵻˈsɛlf/ /məˈsɛlf/	female speaker with US accent

== Bibliography ==
- "Oxford English Dictionary Online".
- Fowler, H.W. (2015). Butterfield, Jeremy (ed.). Fowler's Dictionary of Modern English Usage. Oxford University Press. ISBN 978-0-19-966135-0.
- Huddleston, Rodney; Pullum, Geoffrey (2002). The Cambridge Grammar of the English Language. Cambridge; New York: Cambridge University Press. ISBN 0-521-43146-8.
- "Etymology of I". Online Etymology Dictionary. Douglas Harper, n.d. Web. 12 Dec. 2010.
- "Etymology of Me". Online Etymology Dictionary. Douglas Harper, n.d. Web. 12 Dec. 2010.
- Halleck, Elaine (editor). "Sum: Pronoun "I" again ". LINGUIST List 9.253., n.p., Web. 20 Feb. 1998.
- Jacobsen, Martin (editor). "Sum: Pronoun 'I' ". LINGUIST List 9.253., n.p., Web. 20 Feb. 1998.
- Mahoney, Nicole. "Language Change ". National Science Foundation. n.p. 12 July 2008. Web. 21 Dec. 2010
- Wells, Edward. "Further Elucidation on the Capitalization of 'I' in English". (a paper in progress). Lingforum.com. n.p., Web. 25 Dec. 2010
