= Grammatical person =

Grammatical category distinguishing between speakers, listeners, and others

In linguistics, grammatical person is a grammatical category reflecting the discourse roles of the communicating parties. The expressions distinguish between deictic references to one or more participants in an event. Typically, the distinction is between the speaker (first person), the addressee (second person), and others (third person). A language's set of pronouns is typically defined by grammatical persons. First person includes the speaker (English: I, we), second person is the person or people spoken to (English: your or you), and third person includes all that are not listed above (English: he, she, it, they).

Person can be expressed through dependent and independent markers. Independent forms are those used as separate words, as is the case for many personal pronouns. Dependent forms are more restricted and often realized as bound morphemes. Person morphemes frequently affects verbs, and sometimes nouns or possessive relationships.

== Related classifications ==
=== Number ===
Markers of person almost universally also mark number. It is usually marked by suppletive forms.

=== Inclusive/exclusive distinction ===
Some other languages use different classifying systems, especially in the plural pronouns. One frequently found difference not present in most Indo-European languages is a contrast between inclusive and exclusive "we": a distinction of first-person plural pronouns between including or excluding the addressee.

=== Honorifics ===
Many languages express person with different morphemes in order to distinguish degrees of formality and informality. A simple honorific system common among European languages is the T–V distinction. Some other languages have much more elaborate systems of formality that go well beyond the T–V distinction, and use many different pronouns and verb forms that express the speaker's relationship with the people they are addressing. Many Malayo-Polynesian languages, such as Javanese and Balinese, are well known for their complex systems of honorifics; Japanese, Korean, and Chinese also have similar systems to a lesser extent.

== Other parts of speech ==
=== Verbs ===
In many languages, the verb takes a form dependent on the person of the subject and whether it is singular or plural. In English, this happens with the verb to be as follows:

- I am (first-person singular)
- you are/thou art (second-person singular)
- he, she, one, it is (third-person singular)
- we are (first-person plural)
- you are/ye are (second-person plural)
- they are (third-person plural, and third-person singular)

Other verbs in English take the suffix -s to mark the present tense third person singular, excluding singular 'they'.

In many languages, such as French, the verb in any given tense takes a different suffix for any of the various combinations of person and number of the subject.

=== Nouns ===
The Elamite language had person declension also in nouns, forming a word with the meaning "I/You/they, the [noun]", e.g.:

- sunki-k = I, the king,...
- sunki-t = you, the king,...
- sunki-r = he, the king,...

== Additional persons ==
The grammar of some languages divide the semantic space into more than three persons. The extra categories may be termed fourth person, fifth person, etc. Such terms are not absolute but can refer, depending on context, to any of several phenomena.

Some Algonquian languages and Salishan languages divide the category of third person into two parts: proximate for a more topical third person, and obviative for a less topical third person. The obviative is sometimes called the fourth person.

The fourth person term is also sometimes used for the category of impersonal verbs in Skolt Saami. The so-called "zero person" in Finnish and related languages, in addition to passive voice, may serve to leave the subject-referent open. Zero person subjects are sometimes translated as "one", although in tone it is similar to English's generic you; "Ei saa koskettaa" ("Not allowed to touch", "You should not touch").

== English personal pronouns in the nominative case ==
Pronoun	Person and number	Gender
Standard
I	First-person singular	
we	First-person plural	
you	Second-person singular or second-person plural	
he	Third-person masculine singular	masculine
she	Third-person feminine singular	feminine
it	Third-person neuter (and inanimate) singular	neuter
they	Third-person plural or gender-neutral singular	epicene
Dialectal
me	First-person singular, dialectal Caribbean English and colloquial special uses	
thee	Second-person singular, literary, dialectal Yorkshire, and occasional use by Quakers	
allyuh	Second-person plural, many English-based creole languages, dialectal Caribbean English	
unu	Second-person plural, many English-based creole languages, dialectal Caribbean English	
y'all	Second-person plural, dialectal Southern American, Texan English, and African-American English	
ye	Second-person plural, dialectal Hiberno-English and Newfoundland English	
yinz	Second-person plural, Scots, dialectal Scottish English, Pittsburgh English	
you guys	Second-person plural, dialectal American English and Canadian English	
you(r) lot	Second-person plural, dialectal British English	
yous (guys)	Second-person plural, dialectal New Zealand English	
yous(e)	Second-person plural, Australian English, many urban American dialects like New York City English and Chicago English, as well as Ottawa Valley English. Sporadic usage in some British English dialects, such as Mancunian. Also used by some speakers of Hiberno-English.	
yourse	Second-person plural, Scots, dialect Central Scottish Lowlands, Scouse, Cumbrian, Tyneside, Hiberno English.	
us	First-person plural subject, as in, us guys are going...	
them	Third-person plural subject, as in, them girls drove...	
Archaic
thou	Second-person singular informal subject	
ye	Second-person plural	

== See also ==
=== Grammar ===
- English personal pronouns
- Fourth wall
- Gender-neutral pronoun
- Generic antecedents
- Generic you
- Grammatical conjugation
- Grammatical number
- Illeism
- Personal pronoun
- Preferred gender pronoun
- Singular they
- Verb

=== Works ===
- First Person Singular: Pearson – The Memoirs of a Prime Minister, a Canadian biographical television miniseries
- First Person Singular, a 2020 short story collection by Haruki Murakami
- First Person Singular, a play by Lewis Grant Wallace
- First Person Plural, a book by Cameron West
- Second Person Singular, a book by Sayed Kashua
- Third Person Singular Number, a film by Mostofa Sarwar Farooki
- Third Person Plural, a film directed by James Ricketson and starring Bryan Brown
