= Intensive pronoun =

Type of pronoun

An intensive pronoun (or self-intensifier) adds emphasis to a statement; for example, "I did it myself." While English intensive pronouns (e.g., myself, yourself, himself, herself, ourselves, yourselves, themselves) use the same form as reflexive pronouns, an intensive pronoun is different from a reflexive pronoun because it functions as an adverbial or adnominal modifier, not as an argument of a verb. Both intensive and reflexive pronouns make reference to an antecedent. For example, compare "I will do it myself," where "myself" is a self-intensifier indicating that nobody else did it, to "I sold myself," where "myself" fills the argument role of direct object. This sentence may be extended, as in "I sold myself myself," where the second pronoun emphasizes the fact that nobody helped me to sell myself.

== Terminology ==
Self-intensifiers have also been called simply "intensifiers", or "emphatic reflexives", or "intensive reflexives". In many languages, they are similar or identical to reflexive pronouns.

== In other languages ==
Latin has a dedicated intensifier, ipse, -a, -um, used to emphasize a noun or pronoun in either a subject or a predicate of a sentence.

In Danish, emphasis is indicated using the word selv; "I will do it myself" is rendered Jeg gør det selv. When a verb is used that requires reflexion, it becomes similar to English except that two words are used: "I help myself" is rendered Jeg hjælper mig selv.

In German, emphasis is indicated using the word selbst. "I will do it myself" is rendered Ich werde es selbst tun. Dutch usage of zelf is identical: Ik zal het zelf doen.

In Spanish, as in most other pro-drop languages, emphasis can be added simply by explicitly using the omissible pronoun. Following the above example, "I will do it myself" is rendered "Lo haré yo." Adding "mismo" after the pronoun yields additional emphasis.

French uses a form of the disjunctive pronoun that is followed by the adverb -même (e.g. Je l'ai fait moi-même.).

There are intensive forms of personal pronouns in Udmurt language, Komi language, and Tatar language, e.g., "[you] ourselves": Udmurt: 'асьтэос', Komi: 'асьныд', Tatar: 'үзегез'.

In Russian language the intensifiers are 'sam' (masculine myself, masculine yourself, himself) / sama (feminine myself, feminine yourself, herself) / sami (*selves) and unlike English they differ from the reflexive modifier 'sebya', applicable to all pronouns. Intensifier pronouns may be used to intensify the 'base' pronoun: "ona sama vidit" ("She-herself-sees), as well as by themselves: "sama vidit" (herself-sees), because in Russian the base pronoun may be omitted, because it may be inferred from the declension of the verb. The same is with the Belarusian language.

== See also ==
- Disjunctive pronoun
- Weak pronoun
- Intensifier
