= Oblique case =

Case specifying the use of the object form of pronouns

In grammar, an oblique (abbreviated obl; from Latin: casus obliquus) or objective case (abbr. obj) is a nominal case other than the nominative case and, sometimes, the vocative.

A noun or pronoun in the oblique case can generally appear in any role except as subject, for which the nominative case is used. The term objective case is generally preferred by modern English grammarians, where it supplanted Old English's dative and accusative. When the two terms are contrasted, they differ in the ability of a word in the oblique case to function as a possessive attributive; whether English has an oblique rather than an objective case then depends on how "proper" or widespread one considers the dialects where such usage is employed.

An oblique case often contrasts with an unmarked case, as in English oblique him and them versus nominative he and they. However, the term oblique is also used for languages without a nominative case, such as ergative–absolutive languages; in the Northwest Caucasian languages, for example, the oblique-case marker serves to mark the ergative, dative, and applicative case roles, contrasting with the absolutive case, which is unmarked.

== Hindustani ==
Hindustani (Hindi and Urdu) nouns, pronouns and postpositions decline for an oblique case which exclusively serves to mark the grammatical case roles using the case-marking postpositions. The oblique case has similarities with the vocative case in Hindustani. Some examples of the declension pattern are shown in the tables below:

Pronouns
Case		1P	2P	3P
Nominative		मैं ma͠i	तू tū	ये ye
Oblique	Ergative	मैं ma͠i	तू tū	इस is
Oblique	Regular	मुझ mujh	तुझ tujh	इस is

Singular pronouns are shown.

Noun
Case	Masculine		Feminine	
Case	Singular	Plural	Singular	Plural
Nominative	लड़का laṛkā	लड़के laṛke	लड़की laṛkī	लड़कियाँ laṛkiyā̃
Oblique	लड़के laṛke	लड़कों laṛkõ	लड़की laṛkī	लड़कियों laṛkiyõ

लड़का (laṛkā) = boy, लड़की (laṛkī) = girl

Postpositions
Case	Masculine		Feminine	
Case	Singular	Plural	Singular	Plural
Nominative	का kā	के ke	की kī	
Oblique	के ke		की kī	

का (kā) is equivalent to the possessive 's of English

== Bulgarian ==
Bulgarian, an analytic Slavic language, also has an oblique case form for pronouns:

Dative role:

- "Give that ball to me" дай тaзи топка на мен (day tazi topka na men)

(This oblique case is a relic of the original, more complex proto-Slavic system of noun cases, and there are remnants of other cases in Bulgarian, such as the vocative case of direct address)

== English ==
An objective case is marked on the English personal pronouns and as such serves the role of the accusative and dative cases that other Indo-European languages employ. These forms are often called object pronouns. They serve a variety of grammatical functions which they would not in languages that differentiate the two. An example using first person singular objective pronoun me:

- in an accusative role for a direct object (including double object and oblique ditransitives):

Do you see me?
The army sent me to Korea.

- in a dative role for an indirect object:

Kim passed the pancakes to me.
Kim passed me the pancakes.

- as the object of a preposition (except in possessives):

That picture of me was blurry.
(cf. double genitive as in That picture of mine was stolen.)

- in copular deixis:

[referring to a photograph] This is me on the beach.

- in existentials (sometimes, but not always, replaceable by the nominative—in very formal style):

It's me again.
(cf. Once again, it is I. [formal])
Who is it?—It's me.
(cf. It is I [to whom you are speaking].)
It's me who should fix it.
(cf. Since I made it, it is I who should fix it.)

- in a nominative role with predicate or verbal ellipsis:

Who made this bicycle?—Me.
(cf. Who made this bicycle?—I did.)
I like him.—Hey, me too.
(cf. I like him.—Hey, I do too.)
Who's gonna clean up this mess?—Not me!

- in coordinated nominals:

Me and him are going to the store. (only in colloquial speech)
(cf. Is he going? Yes, he and I are going.)

- as a disjunctive topic marker:

Me, I like French.

The pronoun me is not inflected differently in any of these uses; it is used for all grammatical relationships except the genitive case of possession (in standard English) and a non-disjunctive nominative case as the subject.

- It may also be used as a comedic stylistic effect of blatant error (nonstandard, pidgin, baby or foreigner talk or "broken English"):

[spoken by Cookie Monster] Me so hungry.
(the above example also employs copula deletion to similar effect)

== French ==
Old French had a nominative case and an oblique case, called cas sujet and cas régime respectively.

In Modern French, the two cases have mostly merged and the cas régime has survived as the sole form for the majority of nouns. For example, the word "conte (count, earl)":

- Old French:
  - Nominative: li cuens (singular), li conte (plural)
  - Oblique: le conte (singular), les contes (plural)
- Modern French:
  - le conte (singular), les contes (plural)

In some cases, both the cas sujet and cas régime of one noun have survived but produced two nouns in Modern French with different meanings. For example, today's copain means "friend" and compagnon means "companion", but in Old French these were different declensions of the same noun.

== Kurdish ==
Kurdish has an oblique for pronouns, objects, and for objects of izafe constructs.

== See also ==
- Object pronoun, which in English take the oblique case
- Oblique argument
- Object (grammar)
- Subject pronoun
- Disjunctive pronoun
- Quirky subject
