= Modern English =

Stage of the English language from the contemporary period

- New English present-day English
- English
- Region: English-speaking world
- Era: 17th century – present
- Language family: Indo-European: Germanic; West Germanic; North Sea Germanic; Anglo-Frisian; Anglic; Modern English
- Early forms: Proto-Indo-European: Proto-Germanic; Proto-West Germanic; Proto-English; Old English; Middle English; Early Modern English
- Writing system: Latin script (English alphabet); English Braille, Unified English Braille

Language codes
- ISO 639-1: en
- ISO 639-2: eng
- ISO 639-3: eng
- Glottolog: stan1293
- Linguasphere: 52-ABA

Modern English, sometimes called New English (NE) or present-day English (PDE) as opposed to Middle and Old English, is the form of the English language that has been spoken since the Great Vowel Shift in England, which began in the late 14th century and was completed by the 17th century.

With some differences in vocabulary, texts that date from the early 17th century, such as the works of William Shakespeare and the King James Bible, are considered Modern English, or more specifically, Early Modern English or Elizabethan English. Through colonization, the British Empire spread English to many regions of the world, such as Anglo-America, the Indian subcontinent, Africa, Australia and New Zealand.

Modern English has many dialects spoken in many countries throughout the world, sometimes collectively referred to as the English-speaking world. These dialects include American, Australian, British (containing Anglo-English, Scottish English and Welsh English), Canadian, New Zealand, Caribbean, Hiberno-English (including Ulster English), Indian, Sri Lankan, Pakistani, Nigerian, Philippine, Singaporean, and South African English.

According to the Ethnologue, there are almost one billion speakers of English as a first or second language. English is spoken as a first or a second language in many countries, with most native speakers being in the United States, the United Kingdom, Australia, Canada, New Zealand and Ireland. It "has more non-native speakers than any other language, is more widely dispersed around the world and is used for more purposes than any other language". Its large number of speakers, plus its worldwide presence, have made English a common language (lingua franca) "of the airlines, of the sea and shipping, of computer technology, of science and indeed of (global) communication generally".

== Development ==
Modern English evolved from Early Modern English which was used from the beginning of the Tudor period until the Interregnum and Stuart Restoration in England. By the late 18th century, the British Empire had facilitated the spread of Modern English through its colonies and geopolitical dominance. Commerce, science and technology, diplomacy, art, and formal education all contributed to English becoming the first truly global language. Modern English also facilitated worldwide international communication. English was adopted in North America, India, parts of Africa, Australia, and many other regions. In the post-colonial period, some newly created nations that had multiple indigenous languages opted to continue using Modern English as the official language to avoid the political difficulties inherent in promoting one indigenous language above another.

== Outline of changes ==
The following is an outline of the major changes in Modern English compared to its previous form (Middle English), and also some major changes in English over the course of the 20th century. Note, however, that these are generalizations, and some of these may not be true for specific dialects:

=== Morphology ===
- "like", "same as", and "immediately" are used as conjunctions.
- "The" becomes optional before certain combinations of noun phrases and proper names.

==== Pronouns ====
- Loss of distinction in most dialects between "whom" and "who" in favour of the latter.
- The elevation of singular they to some formal registers.
- Placement of frequency adverbs before auxiliary verbs.

==== Verbs ====
- Regularisation of some English irregular verbs.
- Revival of the present ("mandative") English subjunctive.
- "Will" preferred to "shall" to mark the future tense in the first person.
- Do-support for the verb "have".
- Increase in multi-word verbs.
- Development of auxiliary verbs "wanna", "gonna", "gotta" in informal discourse.
- Usage of English progressive verbs in certain present perfect and past perfect forms.

=== Phonology ===
Up until the American–British split (1600–1725), some major phonological changes in English included:

- Initial cluster reductions, like of /ɡn, kn/ into /n/: making homophones of gnat and nat, and not and knot.
- The meet–meat merger in most dialects: making the words "meat" and "meet" homophones, but, through its exceptions, causing "meat", "threat" and "great" have three different vowels, although all three words once rhymed.
- The foot–strut split: so that "cut" and "put", and "pudding" and "budding" no longer rhyme; and "putt" and "put" are no longer homophones.
- The lot–cloth split: the vowel in words like "cloth" and "off" is pronounced with the vowel in "thought", as opposed to the vowel used in "lot".

After the American-British split, further changes to English phonology included:

- Non-rhotic (/ɹ/-dropping) accents develop in the English of England, Australasia, and South Africa.
- Happy-tensing: final lax [ɪ] becomes tense [i] in words like "happy". Absent from some dialects.
- Yod-dropping: the elision of /j/ in certain consonant clusters, like those found in "chute", "rude", "blue", "chews", and "Zeus".
- Wine–whine merger from the reduction of /ʍ/ to /w/ in all national standard varieties of English, except Scottish and Irish.
- In North American and Australasian English, /t, d/ are reduced to an alveolar tap between vowels, realised as [t̬] or [ɾ].
- Cot–caught merger, the merger of /ɔ/ and /ɑ/ to /ɑ/ in some dialects of General American.

=== Syntax ===
- disuse of the T–V distinction (thou, ye). Contemporary Modern English usually retains only the formal second-person personal pronoun, "you" (ye), used in both formal and informal contexts.
- use of auxiliary verbs becomes mandatory in interrogative sentences.
- "less", rather than "fewer", is used for countable nouns.
- For English comparisons, syntactic comparison (more) is preferred to analytic comparison (-er).
- Usage of the Saxon genitive ('s) has extended beyond human referents.

=== Alphabet ===
Changes in alphabet and spelling were heavily influenced by the advent of printing and continental printing practices.

- The letter thorn (þ), which began to be replaced by th as early as Middle English, finally fell into disuse. In Early Modern English printing, thorn was represented with the Latin y, which appeared similar to thorn in blackletter typeface (𝖞). The last vestige of the letter was in ligatures of thorn, y^{e} (thee), y^{t} (that), y^{u} (thou), which were still seen occasionally in the King James Bible of 1611 and in Shakespeare's folios.
- The letters i and j, previously written as a single letter, began to be distinguished; likewise for u and v. This was a common development of the Latin alphabet during this period.

Consequently, Modern English came to use a purely Latin alphabet of 26 letters.

== See also ==
- History of English
- International English
