= Possessive =

Grammatical use indicating possession

A possessive or ktetic form (abbreviated pos or poss; from Latin: possessivus; Ancient Greek: κτητικός, romanized: ktētikós) is a word or grammatical construction indicating a relationship of possession in a broad sense. This can include strict ownership, or a number of other types of relation to a greater or lesser degree analogous to it.

Most European languages feature possessive forms associated with personal pronouns, like the English my, mine, your, yours, his and so on. There are two main ways in which these can be used (and a variety of terminologies for each):

- Together with a noun, as in my car, your sisters, his boss. Here the possessive form serves as a possessive determiner.
- Without an accompanying noun, as in mine is red, I prefer yours, this book is his. A possessive used in this way is called a substantive possessive pronoun, a possessive pronoun or an absolute pronoun.

Some languages, including English, also have possessive forms derived from nouns or nominal phrases, such as Jane's, the cows' and nobody else's. These can be used in the same two ways as the pronoun-derived forms: Jane's office or that one is Jane's.

Possessives are sometimes regarded as a grammatical case (the possessive case), although they are also sometimes considered to represent the genitive case, or are not assigned to any case, depending on which language is being considered. On the other hand, some languages, such as the Cariban languages, can be said to have a possessed case, used to indicate the other party (the thing possessed) in a possession relationship. A similar feature found in some languages is the possessive affix, usually a suffix, added to the (possessed) noun to indicate the possessor, as in the Finnish taloni ("my house"), where talo means "house" and the suffix -ni means "my".

The concepts of possessive forms and genitive forms are sometimes conflated, although they are not exactly the same. The genitive form, which does not exist in modern English as a productive inflection outside of pronouns (see below), represents an of relationship, which may or may not be possessive; in other words, the possessive is a subset of genitive. For example, the genitive construction "speed of the car" is equivalent to the possessive form "the car's speed". However, the genitive construction "pack of dogs" is not the same as the possessive form "dogs' pack" (though it is the same as "dog pack", which is not possessive).

== Formation ==
=== From pronouns ===
The personal pronouns of many languages correspond to both a set of possessive determiners and a set of possessive pronouns. For example, the English personal pronouns I, you, he, she, it, we and they correspond to the possessive determiners my, your, his, her, its, our and their and also to the (substantive) possessive pronouns mine, yours, his, hers, its (rare), ours and theirs. In some instances there is no difference in form between the determiner and the pronoun; examples include the English his (and its), and informal Finnish meidän (meaning either "our" or "ours").

In some languages, possessive determiners are subject to agreement with the noun they modify and possessive pronouns may be subject to agreement with their antecedent, in gender, number and case. For example, French has mon, ma, mes, respectively the masculine singular, feminine singular and plural forms corresponding to the English possessive determiner my, as well as the forms le mien, la mienne, les mien(ne)s corresponding to English possessive pronoun mine.

Since personal pronouns may also agree in number and gender with their own antecedent or referent, the possessive forms may consequently show agreement with either the "possessor" or the "possessed", or both. In French (and most other Romance languages) the third-person singular possessives do not indicate the gender of the possessor, instead they agree with the possessed (son, sa and ses can all mean "his", "her" or "its"). In standard Dutch and English the form of the possessives (zijn, haar; his, her, its) indicates the grammatical or natural gender of the possessor, but does not depend on properties of the possessed. Additionally, German and several Dutch dialects additionally inflect their possessives, thus giving agreement with both possessor and possessed; German has sein and ihr meaning "his" and "her" respectively, but these inflect to give (for example) feminine forms like seine and ihre, depending on the gender (and number and case) of the thing possessed.

In languages that have a genitive case, the possessive forms corresponding to pronouns may or may not resemble the genitive of those pronouns. For example, in Russian, the genitive of я ya "I" is меня menya ("of me"), whereas the corresponding possessive is мой moy ("my, mine", in masculine singular nominative form). In German the two sets of forms are quite similar (for example, the genitive of ich "I" is meiner, the corresponding possessive pronoun is also meiner in the masculine singular nominative, and the possessive determiner is mein with various endings).

Some languages have no distinct possessive determiners as such, instead using a pronoun together with a possessive particle – a grammatical particle used to indicate possession. For example, in Japanese, "my" or "mine" can be expressed as watashi no, where watashi means "I" and no is the possessive particle. Similarly in Mandarin Chinese, "my" or "mine" is wǒ de, where wǒ means "I" and de is the possessive particle.

An alternative to the pronominal possessive determiner, found in some languages, including Finnish and Hungarian, is the possessive affix, usually a suffix, attached to the noun denoting the thing possessed. For example, in Finnish the suffix -ni means "my", producing forms such as taloni ("my house"), from talo ("house"). Hungarian possessive suffixes are used in a similar way, as in háza ("his/her house"), formed from ház ("house"). In Hungarian this affix can also be used when the possessor is represented by a full noun, as described in the next section.

Pronouns other than personal pronouns, if they have possessive forms, are likely to form them in a similar way to nouns (see below). In English, for example, possessive forms derived from other pronouns include one's, somebody's and nobody's. There is however a distinct form whose for the possessive of the interrogative and relative pronoun who; other languages may have similarly functioning words, such as the Russian чей chey ("whose?"). Another possessive found in Russian and other Slavic languages is the reflexive possessive, corresponding to the general reflexive pronoun; the Russian form is свой svoj (meaning "one's (own)", "my (own)", etc.).

=== From nouns ===
In some languages, possessives can be formed from nouns or nominal phrases. In English, this is done using the ending -'s, as in Jane's, heaven's, the boy's, those young men's, or sometimes just an apostrophe, as in workers', Jesus', the soldiers'. Note that the ending can be added at the end of a noun phrase even when the phrase does not end with its head noun, as in the king of England's; this property inclines many linguists towards the view that the ending is a clitic rather than a case ending (see below, and further at English possessive).

In languages that have a genitive case, the genitive form of a noun may sometimes be used as a possessive (as in German Karls Haus "Karl's house"). Languages such as Japanese and Chinese form possessive constructions with nouns using possessive particles, in the same way as described for pronouns above. An example from Japanese is:

猫 の 色
neko no iro
cat PTCL color
"the cat's color"

In other languages, noun possessives must be formed periphrastically, as in French la plume de ma tante ("my aunt's pen", literally "the pen of my aunt"). In Hungarian, the construction Mária háza is used ("Maria's house", literally "Maria her house", where the final -a in háza is the possessive suffix meaning "her"). The possessor noun can carry an additional dative marker, in which case an article appears before the noun. For example, "Peter's house" may be translated either as:

Péter háza
Peter his-house

Péternek a háza
of-Peter the his-house

== Syntax ==
Possessive determiners are used in combination with a noun, playing the role of a determiner or attributive adjective. In English and some other languages, the use of such a word implies the definite article. For example, my car implies the car that belongs to me or is used by me; it is not correct to precede possessives with an article (*the my car) or other definite determiner such as a demonstrative (*this my car), although they can combine with quantifiers in the same ways that the can (all my cars, my three cars, etc.; see English determiners). This is not the case in all languages; for example in Italian the possessive is usually preceded by another determiner such as an article, as in la mia macchina ("my car", literally "the my car") or quel tuo libro ("that book of yours", literally "that your book").

Some languages place the possessive after the noun, as in Norwegian boka mi ("my book"). Here again the equivalent of the definite article – in this case the definite ending -a on the noun bok – is used in addition to the possessive. However, the forms min bok or mi bok, where the noun bok is in the indefinite form, are equally correct.

Possessive determiners may be modified with an adverb, as adjectives are, although not as freely or as commonly. Such modification is generally limited to such adverbs as more, less, or as much ... as (comparative) or mostly (superlative), for example in This is more my team than your team and This is mostly my team.

Substantive possessive pronouns are used on their own and cannot be used to describe a noun, playing the role of noun phrases, so mine may stand for "my cat", "my sister", "my things", etc. In some languages these may require articles or other determiners, as the French le mien etc. In English, the -'s possessives formed from nouns or noun phrases can be used in the same way; the president's may stand for "the president's office", "the president's policies", etc., as determined by the context.

A related use is that of the predicative expression, as in sentences like the book is mine. Here mine may be considered to be a predicate adjective (like red in the book is red) rather than a pronoun; in English, however, the same possessive form is used. Other languages may use differing forms; for example French may use ...est à moi for "...is mine".

A particular use of possessive pronouns and noun forms in English is that illustrated in phrases like a friend of mine and that coat of Fred's, used to form possessive expressions when the desired determiner is something other than the default the implied in the usual possessive determiner.

== Terminology ==
The terminology used for possessive words and phrases is not consistent among all grammarians and linguists.

What some authors refer to as possessives, others may call genitives, and vice versa. Nowadays, however, the term genitive is most commonly used in relation to languages with a developed case system (in which the "genitive case" often has a wider range of functions than merely forming possessives), while in languages like English, such words are usually called possessives rather than genitives. A given language may have distinct genitive and possessive forms, as in the example of Russian given above. (The English possessive in -'s is sometimes called the Saxon genitive; this alludes to its derivation from the genitive case that existed in Old English. It may also be called the prenominal genitive; this also applies to analogous forms in languages such as German.)

Words like the English my and your have traditionally been called possessive adjectives. However, modern linguists note that they behave more like determiners rather than true adjectives (see examples in the § Syntax section above), and thus prefer the term possessive determiner. In some other languages, however, the equivalent words behave more like true adjectives (compare the Italian example above, for instance). While for most authors the term possessive pronoun is reserved (as in this article) for possessives like mine and yours that do not qualify an explicit noun, the term is sometimes taken also to include all possessive forms that correspond to pronouns even though they behave as determiners. Some authors who classify both sets of words as possessive pronouns or genitive pronouns apply the terms dependent/independent, weak/strong or adjectival/substantival to refer, respectively, to my, your, etc. and mine, yours, etc. Thus my is termed a dependent (or weak or adjectival) possessive pronoun, while mine is an independent (or strong or substantival) possessive pronoun.

According to the OED, the first reference to possessive pronouns is found in 1530; the first use of possessive as a noun occurs in 1591, the first use of possessive case (which notes that it is like the Latin genitive, and may be called the genitive case in reference to English also) occurs in 1763, and the first use of possessive adjective dates from 1870.

The equivalent of Latin possessivus in Ancient Greek is κτητικός (ktētikós); linguistic terminology also refers to possessives as ktetics, particularly ktetic (possessive) adjectives and names derived from ktetics (ktetic personal names).

== Possessive/genitive and possessed/pertensive ==
Nouns or pronouns with a possessive form are sometimes described as being in the possessive case. A more commonly used term in describing the grammar of various languages is genitive case, but that usually denotes a case with a broader range of functions than just producing possessive forms. (Some languages occasionally use the dative case to denote the possessor, as in the Serbo-Croatian kosa mu je gusta "his hair is thick" (literally "the hair to him is thick" in which "to him" is the dative pronoun mu).)

Other theorists reject the idea that the possessive in languages like English represents a grammatical case since possessive forms do not generally behave in a parallel fashion to what are normally identified as cases. In particular, in English, as noted above, the -'s can attach to noun phrases even when they do not end with their head noun, as in the king of Spain's, which is not typical behavior for a case ending. For further discussion of the issue, see English possessive § Status of the possessive as a grammatical case.

Some languages, such as the Cariban languages, can be said to have a possessed case, which indicates the thing possessed. This is also called pertensive marking. In many Afro-Asiatic languages, such as Arabic, nouns take a form with similar significance called the construct state, sometimes even if the possessor is marked in the genitive case. Classical Nahuatl similarly presents an inflected possessed form (or case) in nouns, which contrasts with a non-possessed form (the absolutive).

== Semantics ==
The relationship expressed by possessive determiners and similar forms is not necessarily one of possession in the strict sense of ownership. In English, strict possession has been found to be expressed in only about 40% of the situations labeled as "possessive" by linguists, a fact which may incline some to prefer the more traditional term "genitive". The "possessor" may be, for example:

- the person or thing to which the "possessed" stands in the designated relationship (my mother, his wife, your subordinates, our boss);
- the person or thing of which the "possessed" is a part (my leg, the building's walls);
- a person or thing affiliated with or identifying with the "possessed" (his country, our class, my people);
- the performer, or sometimes the undergoer, of an action (his arrival, the government's overthrow)
- the creator, supervisor, user, etc. of the "possessed" (Prince's album, the Irish jockey's horse).

For more examples, see Possession (linguistics) and English possessive § Semantics.

== History ==
Before the 18th century, the word possessive was not used, and was considered merely one of several uses of the genitive case. This began to change in 1762 with Robert Lowth, whose use of possessive was copied by subsequent writers. One result of this shift in terminology is the mistaken belief that the possessive form is only used for actual cases of possession or ownership (e.g., my book, the family's home) and not to indicate other, non-ownership forms of affiliation or association (e.g., their neighbor, the tree's environs).

== See also ==
- Construct state
- Genitive construction
- Possessive antecedent
- Possessive determiner

== Sources ==
- Fraser, Peter M. (2000). "Ethnics as Personal Names". Greek Personal Names: Their Value as Evidence (PDF). Oxford: Oxford University Press. pp. 149–157. Archived from the original (PDF) on 2019-10-18.
