= Eastern Lombard grammar =

Eastern Lombard grammar reflects the main features of Romance languages: the word order of Eastern Lombard is usually SVO, nouns are inflected in number, adjectives agree in number and gender with the nouns, verbs are conjugated in tenses, aspects and moods and agree with the subject in number and person. The case system is present only for the weak form of the pronoun.

Eastern Lombard has always been a spoken language and, in spite of sporadic attempts to fix the main features in a written grammar, a unique canonical variety has never prevailed over the others. The present day situation sees a large number of varieties, roughly identifiable by the area where a particular variety is spoken (so, you may encounter a Bergamasque, Brescian, a Camunic variety, etc.). Varieties differ mainly in phonology, syntax and word choice.

This grammar is based on the Brescian variety and, although local differences (even remarkable) can be found, the basic principles are generally valid for the other varieties.

== Nouns ==
Nouns in Eastern Lombard have two grammatical genders: masculine and feminine.

=== Singular ===
==== Masculine ====
Masculine singular nouns generally end with a consonant:
• gat, cat
• òm, man
but can often end with a stressed vowel: this usually happens where a historical -n has been dropped.
• cà, dog
• pà, bread
• carbù, coal

==== Feminine ====
Feminine singular nouns generally end with -a:
• gàta, female cat
• fónna, woman
but can occasionally end with a consonant:
• néf, snow
Note that, in some varieties, the final -a represents an /ɔ/ sound, that can make feminine words sound like they end in *-o.

=== Plural ===
==== Masculine ====
Masculine plural nouns follow particular rules depending on the ending of the singular form of the noun.
If the singular ends with a stressed vowel, the word does not change in the plural:
• el cà → i cà
If the singular ends with -c, -j, -m, -p, -r or -s, the plural remains identical to the singular:
• el sac → i sac
• el ventàj → i ventàj
• el póm → i póm
• el cóp → i cóp
• el pér → i pér
• el ciós → i ciós
If the singular ends with -t, the plural will end with -cc (pronounced [tʃ]):
• el gat → i gacc
If the singular ends with -n, the plural will end with -gn (pronounced [ɲ]):
• el àzen → i àzegn
If the singular ends with -l, the plural will end with -j:
• el caàl → i caàj

==== Feminine ====
Feminine plural nouns generally end with -e:
• la gàta → le gàte
• la fónna → le fónne
When the singular ends with a consonant, the plural follows the rules applied to masculine nouns.

== Article ==
All the articles in Eastern Lombard agree in number and gender with the corresponding noun. Articles can be definite (like the in English) and indefinite (like a/an). Indefinite articles are used only with singular nouns. However, to indicate an indefinite number of objects, Lombard exploits something similar to the partitive in French, but because the partitive system is much less developed in Lombard, this class of articles is included in the indefinite system.

=== Definite Article ===
Definite	Masculine	Feminine
Singular	el, ol, al	la
Plural	i	le, i

Note:

- El is the form used for the singular definite article in the Brescian variety but in other dialects the forms ol (Bergamasque) or al (Cremasque) are preferred.
- The most widespread form for the feminine plural article in Eastern Lombard is le but in the area of Bergamo le is replaced by the form i that is the plural masculine form.

Brescian: 'le fónne'
Bergamasque 'i fómne' (eng. the women)
Note that speakers that use one form may not find correct the other.

- When el is followed by a vowel, it becomes l', like in:

El ga majàt l'armì del póm ("He ate the seed of the apple").

- When el is preceded by a vowel, it becomes 'l, like in:

A la fì vé 'l bel ("The good part comes at the end").

=== Indefinite Article ===
Bresciano:

	Masculine	Feminine
Singular	en ¹ ²	ena ¹ ³
Plural	dèi ⁴	dèle ⁴

Bergamasque:

	Masculine	Feminine
Singular	ü	öna
Plural	di	di

==== References ====
¹ – In some varieties of Eastern Lombard, en can be realized as /øn/ and written as ön or even /ø/ written as ö.
² – The masculine article en becomes 'n when it follows a vowel, as in:
• L'éra 'n gran rebelòt, "It was a big mess."
³ – The feminine article ena becomes 'na when it follows a vowel, and en' when it precedes one.
⁴ – From a historical point of view, dèi and dèle should not be considered the plural forms of en and 'na. However, practically, they behave as they are plural form of the indefinitive articles:
• Gó ést en cà, "I saw a dog."
• Gó ést dèi cà, "I saw some dogs."

== Modifiers ==
=== Adjectives ===
In Eastern Lombard, adjectives with qualificative function usually go after the noun they modify, and agree with it in number (singular/plural) and gender (masculine/feminine).
Plural of adjectives is formed observing the same rules of nouns. So we have:

'n òm pesèn / du òm pesègn (a short man / two short men)
'na fómna pesèna / dò fómne pesène (a short woman / two short women)

Although, in general, if compared with the Italian tongue, Eastern Lombard is less permissive under this aspect, some common adjectives like bèl (beautiful), bröt (ugly), gran (big), bù (good, good-natured), brào (good, clever) can also be placed before the noun. In this case the meaning can take on a different nuance, e.g.:

en bröt òm (a bad-natured man)
en òm bröt (an ugly man)

=== Superlative ===
Eastern Lombard expresses an extreme degree or absolute state of something by means of the absolute superlative, that corresponds to the English form very + adjective.
Differently from Italian, Spanish and other Romance languages, Eastern Lombard lacks a counterpart of the form adjective+issimo and also lacks a cognate for the Italian molto. In the Brescian variety, the most widespread form is adjective + fés, e.g.:

l'è bèl fés (it is very beautiful)
'na maöla dólsa fés (a very sweet strawberry)

Although, the adverb fés cannot be used if the adjective is placed before the noun. In that case the superlative form is obtained by the adverb gran placed before the adjective, e.g.:

du gran bèj caàj (two very beautiful horses)
l'è 'n gran brào barbér (he is a very good barber)

Another way to express a high degree of something is to reinforce it by means of a second adjective+ét/ènt (formerly a present participle), for example:

só ché mis gosét (I am very wet; literally: dripping wet)
la padèla l'è calda sbrojéta (the pan is very hot; literally: burning hot)

the second element is very frequently a repetition of the first adjective, i.e.:

'na máchina nöa nöènta (a very new car)
ghè za ciar ciarènt (it is already very clear)
del dutùr ghéra zó pjé pjenènt (it was very full of people down there to the doctor room)

=== Demonstrative adjectives ===
Eastern Lombard makes a two-way distinction of demonstrative: the proximal form for the singular masculine is chèsto, while the distal form is chèl. This is the declension for the two forms:

	Proximal		Distal	
	Singular	Plural	Singular	Plural
Masculine	chèsto	chèsti ^{1}	chèl	chèi
Feminine	chèsta	chèste	chèla	chèle

1. An alternative form is chès·cc, pronounced [ˈkɛstʃə], but the schwa is very reduced and hardly pronounced.

Both the proximal and the distal form are frequently emphasized with chè and là after the noun. So for example:

chèsto pà or chèsto pà chè or chèl pà chè(this bread);

chèl pà or chèl pà là (that bread).

== Pronouns ==
Pronouns are classified in personal pronouns (referring to entities), demonstrative pronouns (deictic function), interrogative pronouns (to formulate questions) and relative pronouns (linking sentence together).

=== Personal Pronouns ===
Personal pronouns decline in number (singular and plural) and person (first, second and third). For the third person, gender (masculine and feminine) represents a further distinction.

Number	Person (Gender)	Tonic form	Proclitic subject	Object Proclitic/Enclitic			Dative Proclitic/Enclitic		Possessive
Singular	1.	mé	–	ma		-m	ma	-m	me
Singular	2.	té	ta	ta		-t	ta	-t	tò
Singular	3. (M.)	lü^{3}	el	l'	el/la^{4}	-l	ga	-ga	sò
Singular	3. (F.)	lé	la	l'	la	-la	ga	-ga	sò
Plural	1.	nóter	(en, ma)^{2}	ga or ma		-ga or -m	ga or ma	-ga or -m	nòst^{1}
Plural	2.	vóter	–	va		-f	va	-f	vòst ^{1}
Plural	3. (M.)	lur	i	i	i/ia	-i	ga	-ga	sò
Plural	3. (F.)	lùre	le	i	le/ia	-le	ga	-ga	sò

Notes:

1. Unlike the other possessive pronouns, nòst and vòst decline as adjective in number and gender:

	nòst		vòst	
	Singular	Plural	Singular	Plural
Masculine	nòst	nòscc	vòst	vòscc
Feminine	nòsta	nòste	vòsta	vòste

2. Not used in urban Brescian but quite common in other varieties:

en va a Bèrghem (we go to Bergamo)
dài che mal ciàpa (hurry up, we can catch it)

3. The tonic form of the 3rd persons (either singular or plural) have two additional forms to add a proximal or distal value to the pronoun, when this refers to an animate subject:

lüche 'l màja compàgn de 'n luf (This man eats like a wolf)
i è stàde lùrela (It was those (girls/women) )

The following table shows the eight possible forms:

	proximal	distal
Singular Masculine	lüche	lüla
Plural Masculine	lùrche	lùrla
Singular Feminine	léche	léla
Plural Feminine	lùreche	lùrela

4. The situation for the object proclitic pronoun for the third persons (both singular and plural) is further complicated by the fact that there is a different behavior whether the following verb is a simple or a compound form. For example:

mé le càte sö (I pick them up)
mé ió catàde sö (I have picked them up)
lur i la càta sö (they pick it up)
lur i l'à catàt sö (they have picked it up)

Examples of use of the pronouns:

- Tonic form can be used as subject at the beginning of the sentence or as indirect object after a preposition.

mé nó a Milà (I go to Milan)
ègne con té (I come with you)

- A peculiar feature of Eastern Lombard is the proclitic form for the subject. This form precedes the main verb and is obligatory for the second singular person and the third person (singular and plural).

Té ta sét dré a majà 'l ris (you are eating rice)

- The proclitic form for the direct object precedes the verb, as in:

mé ta ède (I see you)
mé.tonic.subject ta.clitic.object ède.1st.sing

- The dative proclitic form precedes the verb, as in:

chèsta tùrta, la ma pjas pròpe (this cake, I really like it). Literally:
chèsta.fem.sing tùrta, la.subject.clitic ma.dative.clitic pjas.present.3rd.sing pròpe

- The object enclitic is used mainly for pronominal forms of infinitive and imperative:

i völ copàm (they want to kill me.)
scrìel zó! (write it down!)

- When both an enclitic dative and an enclitic object are present, the enclitic dative comes before and an -e- is introduced between the two enclitic pronouns:

el pöl dàfel adès (he can give it to you now)
scrìemej zó! (write them down [to me, for me]!)

=== Demonstrative Pronouns ===
Demonstrative pronouns are identical in form with the demonstrative adjectives (see corresponding table). Of course, they occur without a noun and they agree in number and gender with the referent.
Demonstrative pronouns are almost always used with the deictic particle ché or là. However, while with demonstrative adjectives chèl can be used in combination with ché, demonstrative pronouns do not accept the expression *chèl ché. So:

chèsto s·cèt ché (this boy) -> chèsto ché (this one)
chèl s·cèt là (that boy) -> chèl là (that one)
chèl s·cèt ché (this boy) -> no corresponding expression (*chèl ché is not an acceptable form).

In pronoun resolution (finding the referent of a pronoun), strong preference is given to animate entities rather to inanimate entities.

== Verbs ==
One of the first descriptions of the verb declension of Eastern Lombard verbs is included in the small dictionary edited in 1951 by Stefano Pinelli

=== Non finite Mood ===
==== Infinitive ====
According to the infinitive form, verbs are classified in two classes:

The first class includes the verbs ending in -à:
Parlà (to speak)
Cantà (to sing)
Nà (to go)

The second class includes the verbs with the infinitive ending in -ì or -er. Note that almost all the verbs of this second class can present two infinitive forms, one ending in -ì and the other ending in -er. For example:

Lizì = Lèzer (to read)
Scriì = Scrìer (to write)
Patì = Patéser (to suffer)

The form in -ì is mandatory when an enclitic pronoun is added:
Gó de lizìl (I have to read it)
while the form in -er is generally preferred when the infinitive has no enclitic pronouns attached:
Gó de lèzer (I have to read)

Bergamasque instead alternates the form in -í with a form identical to the 3rd singular of present indicative mood.

Gó de lès (I have to read) – compare with: Lü 'l lès el giornàl (he reads the newspaper)

therefore the two forms of the infinitive are:
Lezì = Lès (to read)
Scriì = Scrif (to write)
Corì = Cór (to run)

==== Past Participle ====
Past participle is used in the compound tenses present perfect and past perfect. The regular past participle is made adding an -t (or -da for feminine in adjective construction and tenses that require gender agreement) after the infinitive form. Verbs of the second class use the form ending in -ì. For example:

Parlà + t => Parlàt
Cantà + t => Cantàt
Scriì + t => Scriìt
Patì + t => Patìt

=== Indicative Mood ===
==== Present Tenses ====
There are two present tenses in Eastern Lombard:
A simple present and a present progressive:

===== Simple Present =====
The Simple Present, is conjugated as follows:

First class (infinitive in -à: cantà (to sing) )
I sing.: cànte
II sing.: càntet
III sing.: cànta
I plur.: cantóm
II plur.: cantìf
III plur.: cànta

Second class (infinitive in -ì/-er: córer (to run) )
I sing.: córe
II sing.: córet
III sing.: cór
I plur.: coróm
II plur.: curìf
III plur.: cór

The paradigms above are presented without the corresponding pronouns. II person singular and III personal singular and plural cannot be separated by their clitic pronoun.
The following paradigm is presented with either the personal pronoun and the clitic pronoun:

mé cànte
té ta càntet
lü el cànta (III person singular masculine)
lé la cànta (III person singular feminine)
nóter cantóm
vóter cantìf
lur i cànta (III person plural masculine)
lùre le cànta (III person plural feminine)

The first person plural can also be conjugated with the clitic pronoun en + III sing.

nóter cantóm = nóter en cànta

This form can be prevalent or even exclusive in certain varieties (for example in Bergamasque).

Another local way to conjugate the I person plural is

nóter càntem

where the clitic pronoun seems to have shifted and merged with the declension.

===== Interrogative form of the verb =====
A feature which Lombard tongue shares (among Romance languages) with French is the interrogative conjugation of the verb. This form is much better preserved in Eastern Lombard than in Western Lombard, where superstratum effects by Italian are stronger. The analogy with French tongue holds at a syntactical level, i.e. interrogative form means a verb–subject order. A difference consists in the fact that subject particles are enclitic (no accent) and agglutinate with the verb. Internal Sandhi phenomena may take place as well canta-la? turns into càntela?. So, eastern Lombard verbs have a distinct conjugation paradigm for the interrogative function, where clitic pronouns shift after the verb and solder with it:

First class
I sing.: càntej? that corresponds to (do I) sing?
II sing.: càntet? that corresponds to (do you) sing?
III sing.masc.: càntel? that corresponds to (does he) sing?
III sing.fem.: càntela? that corresponds to (does she) sing?
I plur.: cantómej that corresponds to (do we) sing?
II plur.: cantìf that corresponds to (do you) sing?
III plur.masc.: càntej? that corresponds to (do they) sing?
III plur.fem.: càntele? that corresponds to (do they) sing?

It is worthwhile noting that some Camunic dialects show a periphrastic interrogative form, with syntax similar to English tongue:

- Che fal dí?= What does he/she say?
- Che fal fá?= What does he/she do?
- Che fal pensá che?= What does he/she think?

Note that usual interrogative form is applied to the auxiliary verb fá in this context.

===== Negative form of the verb =====
The negative form is obtained by adding the negation particle mìa after the verb:

I sing.: cànte mìa that corresponds to (I) don't sing
II sing.: càntet mìa
III sing.: cànta mìa
I plur.: cantóm mìa
II plur.: cantìf mìa
III plur.: cànta mìa

===== Present Progressive =====
The Present progressive, that is formed with the simple present of the verb véser + dré a + infinitive (literally "to be behind to", meaning "to keep up with"):

First class (infinitive in -à: cantà (to sing) )
I sing.: só dré a cantà
II sing.: sét dré a cantà
III sing.: (l')è dré a cantà
I plur.: sóm dré a cantà
II plur.: sìf dré a cantà
III plur.: (i)è dré a cantà

Second class (infinitive in -ì/-er: córer (to run) )
I sing.: só dré a córer
II sing.: sét dré a córer
III sing.: (l')è dré a córer
I plur.: sóm dré a córer
II plur.: sìf dré a córer
III plur.: (i)è dré a córer

==== Past Tenses ====
There are four past tenses. A simple past (imperfect) and three compound pasts (past progressive, present perfect and past perfect):

===== Imperfect =====
The Imperfect tense, which refers to any repeated, continuous, or habitual past action, is conjugated as follows:

First class (infinitive in -à: cantà (to sing) )
I sing.: cantàe
II sing.: cantàet
III sing.: cantàa
I plur.: cantàem
II plur.: cantàef
III plur.: cantàa

Second class (infinitive in -ì/-er: córer (to run) )
I sing.: curìe
II sing.: curìet
III sing.: curìa
I plur.: curìem
II plur.: curìef
III plur.: curìa

===== Past Progressive =====
The Past Progressive stresses the fact that the action was continuous in the past. This tense is formed with the imperfect of the verb véser (to be) + dré a + the infinitive:

I sing.: sére dré a cantà
II sing.: séret dré a cantà
III sing.: (l')éra dré a cantà
I plur.: sérem dré a cantà
II plur.: séref dré a cantà
III plur.: (i)éra dré a cantà

===== Present Perfect =====
The Present Perfect is used for every past action without strong connotation on the aspect of the verb, otherwise speakers prefer Imperfect or Past Progressive tenses. Notably, Lombard does not have a Preterite.

The Present Perfect is formed with the present of the verb ìga (to have) + the past participle or with the present of the verb véser + the past participle:

Example from cantà(to sing), with auxiliary verb ìga:
I sing.: gó cantàt
II sing.: ghét cantàt
III sing.: ga cantàt
I plur.: góm cantàt
II plur.: ghif cantàt
III plur.: ga cantàt

Example from sta (to stay), with auxiliary verb véser:

I sing.: só stat
II sing.: sét stat
III sing.: (l')è stat
I plur.: sóm stacc
II plur.: sìf stacc
III plur.: (i)è stacc

===== Past Perfect =====
The Past Perfect expresses that the action was completed in the past before some other event.
This tense is formed with the Imperfect of the verb ìga (to have) + the past participle or with the Imperfect of the verb véser + the past participle (similarly to the Present Perfect):

I sing.: ghìe cantàt
II sing.: ghìet cantàt
III sing.: ghìa cantàt
I plur.: ghìem cantàt
II plur.: ghìef cantàt
III plur.: ghìa cantàt

I sing.: sére stat
II sing.: séret stat
III sing.: (l')éra stat
I plur.: sérem stacc
II plur.: séref stacc
III plur.: (i)éra stacc

==== Future Tenses ====
There are three future tenses. A simple future and two compound futures (future progressive and future perfect):

===== Simple Future =====
The Simple Future, is conjugated as follows:

First class (infinitive in -à: cantà (to sing) )
I sing.: cantaró
II sing.: cantarét
III sing.: cantarà
I plur.: cantaróm
II plur.: cantarìf
III plur.: cantarà

Second class (infinitive in -ì/-er: córer (to run) )
I sing.: coraró
II sing.: corarét
III sing.: corarà
I plur.: coraróm
II plur.: corarìf
III plur.: corarà

===== Future Progressive =====
The Future Progressive is formed with the simple future of the verb véser (to be) + dré a + the infinitive:

I sing.: saró dré a cantà
II sing.: sarét dré a cantà
III sing.: sarà dré a cantà
I plur.: saróm dré a cantà
II plur.: sarìf dré a cantà
III plur.: sarà dré a cantà

===== Future Perfect =====
The Future Perfect is formed with the simple future of the auxiliary verb ìga (to have) + the past participle or with the simple future of vèser + the past participle (similarly to the Present Perfect):

I sing.: garó cantàt
II sing.: garét cantàt
III sing.: garà cantàt
I plur.: garóm cantàt
II plur.: garif cantàt
III plur.: garà cantàt

I sing.: saró stat
II sing.: sarét stat
III sing.: sarà stat
I plur.: saróm stacc
II plur.: sarìf stacc
III plur.: sarà stacc

=== Subjunctive and Conditional moods ===
Subjunctive and conditional moods are used to form the hypothetical sentences and to express desire.
The paradigms for a regular verb (cantà = to sing) are the following:

person

subjunctive present

subjunctive past

conditional

I sing.
II sing.
III sing.
I plur.
II plur.
III plur.

càntes
càntes
cànte
cantómes
cantìghes
cànte

cantèse
cantèset
cantès
cantèsem
cantèsef
cantès

cantarèse
cantarèset
cantarès
cantarèsem
cantarèsef
cantarès

=== Imperative mood ===
Imperative mood has only one tense (present) and three persons (II singular, I and II plural).
The paradigm is the following:

person

I class verbs
(ending in -à)

II class verbs
(ending in -ì / -er)

II sing.
I plur.
II plur.

cànta
cantóm
cantì

scrìf
scrióm
scriì

Imperative can also bring an enclitic pronoun to specify the object of the action or toward who it is directed. In this case the conjugation for the II singular person can be slightly different. So we have:

cànta! (you sing!)

but

càntela! (sing it!)
where -la is the enclitic pronoun indicating the object (in this example: III person singular feminine).

càntega! (sing to them)
where -ga indicates toward who is directed the action (in this example: III person plural).

and for the II class verbs:

scrìf! (you write!)

but

scrìel! (write it!)
scrìem! (write to me!)

== Phrasal verbs ==
Eastern Lombard makes a large use of phrasal verbs, i.e. a combination of a verb and an adverb of place. The meaning of the resulting form often significantly differs from the basic verb meaning. Here are some examples:

catà (to pick up)
catà fò (to choose)
catà sö (to pick up, to drive over someone/something in a vehicle)
catà sa (to retrieve, to refer to unconcerning matters)
catà zó (to pick from a tree)

tö (to buy, to take)
tö dré (to bring with oneself)
tö sö (to take up)
tö dét (to engage, to give an employment)
tö fò (to ask for rest days)
tö zó (to assume drugs or medical treatments)

leà (to lift)
leà fò (to breed)
leà sö (to stand up)

Note that the adverbial particle always comes immediately after the group verb + enclitic pronouns, e.g.:

te ghét de laàl zó (you have to wash it down)
càtemej sö, per pjazér (pick them up [for me], please)

== Auxiliary verbs ==
Eastern Lombard has two auxiliary verbs: véser (to be) and ìga (to have) and are used in the same way as in Italian.

=== The verb Véser (to be) ===
Besides being used as copula or to express existence (like to be), Véser is also an auxiliary verb, contrary to the use of the English Present Perfect.
The forms in the present tense are irregular:

I sing.: só
II sing.: sét
III sing.: (l')è
I plur.: sóm
II plur.: sìf
III plur.: (i)è

=== The verb Ìga (to have) ===
The peculiarity of the verb ìga in Eastern Lombard is that it is always bound to a pronominal particle. The infinitive form, for example, is ìga, where the particle -ga is a 1st person plural pronoun (comparable with the pronoun ci of the Italian).
When a different pronoun is needed, the particle -ga is replaced with the proper pronoun, for example:

L'è bèl a ìga i sólcc (It is good to have money)
but
La dis de ìl vést (She says to have seen it)

The same occurs in the conjugated forms, with the exception that the pronominal particle comes before the verb instead of after. For example:

Gó du gacc (I have two cats)
but
L'ó ést (I have seen it)

The complete conjugation for the indicative present is:

I sing.: gó
II sing.: ghét
III sing.: ga
I plur.: góm
II plur.: ghìf
III plur.: ga

Certain varieties (mostly Bergamasque) drop the pronominal particle when conjugated as auxiliary verb, thus, in that case, the correct expressions are:

Gó öna moér e du s·cècc (I have a wife and two sons)
but
Ó biìt tròp (I have drunk too much)

=== Convergence of the imperfect ===
The imperfect conjugation of the auxiliary verbs seems to confuse and interchange the inflections.
Etymologically the two auxiliary verbs should be conjugated as follows:

véser:
I sing.: sére
II sing.: séret
III sing.: (l')éra
I plur.: sérem
II plur.: séref
III plur.: (i) éra

ìga:
I sing.: ghìe
II sing.: ghìet
III sing.: ghìa
I plur.: ghìem
II plur.: ghìef
III plur.: ghìa

But, beside these forms, the followings can often be found:

véser:
I sing.: sìe
II sing.: sìet
III sing.: (l')ìa
I plur.: sìem
II plur.: sìef
III plur.: (i) ìa

ìga:
I sing.: ghére
II sing.: ghéret
III sing.: ghéra
I plur.: ghérem
II plur.: ghéref
III plur.: (i) ghéra

Therefore, the following sentences can be found with no apparent preference:
El ghìa fat sö 'na ca.
El ghéra fat sö 'na ca.
Both meaning He had built a house.

== Negation ==
In Eastern Lombard, negation is generally expressed with the form mìa (or locally mìga) after the verb.

el tò s·cèt el stüdia mìa l'Inglés (Your son is not studying English).

In the case of a compound tense, the negation occurs after the auxiliary.

só mìa nàt a scöla (I did not go to school).

Differently from Italian where the negative sentence pattern contemplates and requires the use of redundant negative particles, Eastern Lombard doesn't. Thus, when an indefinite pronoun with negative value is already present in the sentence, the particle mìa is usually dropped (even though in certain conditions it is tolerated).

ghéra niènt de fa (there was nothing to do).
Compare with the Italian:
non c'era niente da fare.

mé gó ést nüsü (I didn't see anybody).
In Italian would be rendered with:
io non ho visto nessuno .

el ga mài lauràt (he has never worked).
Italian:
non ha mai lavorato.

The forms:
ghéra mìa niènt de fa and mé gó mìa ést nüsü are tolerated while the form el ga mìa mài lauràt is not.

A less common way to express negation is the use of the particle nó before the verb or before the proclitic subject pronoun. This form has almost everywhere been replaced by the use of mìa. It seems to have crystallized uniquely in few expressions like:

mé nó crède! (I don't think so!)

gne nó 'l va, gne nó 'l vé. (neither it goes, nor comes it).

== Bibliography ==
- Glauco Sanga: 'Dialetto e folklore. Ricerca a Cigole' Studi e contributi di: Giorgio Ferrari, Glauco Sanga. MPL 5 Collana Mondo Popolare in Lombardia 5, Milano, Silvana, 1979
- Mora, Vittorio, Note di grammatica del dialetto bergamasco – Bergamo, Edizioni orobiche, 1966.
- B, G. Bernini, Profilo tipologico del dialetto bergamasco (pdf)
- Umberto Zanetti, La grammatica bergamasca – Bergamo, Sestante, 2004. ISBN 88-87445-59-1.
- "Dizionario italiano-bergamasco", compilato da Carmelo Francia e Emanuele Gambarini, Bergamo: Grafital, 2001.
- "Dizionario bergamasco-italiano", compilato da Carmelo Francia e Emanuele Gambarini, Bergamo: Grafital, 2004.

== See also ==
- Eastern Lombard
