= Bouchee =

Bouchee or Bouchée may refer to:

- Bouchée à la Reine, a French pastry dish. See Coca (pastry)#Similar recipes along the Mediterranean
- Bouchée, a small pastry case filled with a savory mixture, served as an Hors d'œuvre
- 'Une bouchée de', French for 'a mouthful of'. See French articles and determiners#Quantifiers

== People with the surname ==
- Ed Bouchee (1933–2013), American baseball player
