= Article (grammar) =

Word used with a noun to indicate the type of reference being made by the noun

In grammar, an article is any of a small set of words or affixes (such as a, an, and the in English) used with nouns to limit or give definiteness to the application. The category of articles constitutes a part of speech. These words represent a specific object, depending on the situation, but (a) is less specific than (the).

Articles combine with nouns to form noun phrases, and typically specify the grammatical definiteness of the noun phrase. In English, the and a (rendered as an when followed by a vowel sound) are the definite and indefinite articles respectively. Articles in many other languages also carry additional grammatical information such as gender, number, and case. Articles are part of a broader category called determiners, which also include demonstratives, possessive determiners, and quantifiers. In linguistic interlinear glossing, articles are abbreviated as art.

== Types of articles ==
=== Definite article ===
A definite article is an article that marks a definite noun phrase. Definite articles, such as the English the, are used to refer to a particular member of a group. It may be something that the speaker has already mentioned, or it may be something uniquely specified.

For example, Sentence 1 uses the definite article and thus expresses a request for a particular book. In contrast, Sentence 2 uses an indefinite article and thus conveys that the speaker would be satisfied with any book.

1. Give me the book.
2. Give me a book.

The definite article can also be used in English to indicate a specific class among other classes:

The cabbage white butterfly lays its eggs on.
Members of the Brassica genus.

Some languages (such as the continental North Germanic languages, Bulgarian or Romanian) have definite articles only as suffixes.

=== Indefinite article ===
An indefinite article is an article that marks an indefinite noun phrase. Indefinite articles are those such as English "a" or "an", which do not refer to a specific identifiable entity. Indefinites are commonly used to introduce a new discourse referent which can be referred back to in subsequent discussion:

1. A monster ate a cookie. His name is Cookie Monster.

Indefinites can also be used to generalize over entities that have some property in common:

1. A cookie is a wonderful thing to eat.

Indefinites can also be used to refer to specific entities whose precise identity is unknown or unimportant.

1. A monster must have broken into my house last night and eaten all my cookies.
2. A friend of mine told me that happens frequently to people who live on Sesame Street.

Indefinites also have predicative uses:

1. Leaving my door unlocked was a bad decision.

Indefinite noun phrases are widely studied within linguistics, in particular because of their ability to take exceptional scope.

=== Proper article ===
A proper article indicates that its noun is proper, and refers to a unique entity. It may be the name of a person, the name of a place, the name of a planet, etc. The Māori language has the proper article a, which is used for personal nouns; so, "a Pita" means "Peter". In Māori, when the personal nouns have the definite or indefinite article as an important part of it, both articles are present; for example, the phrase "a Te Rauparaha", which contains both the proper article a and the definite article Te refers to the person named Te Rauparaha.

The definite article is used with some proper names, called arthrous proper nouns (from Greek ἄρθρον "a joint; an article"). Examples include the Amazon or the Hebrides. In these cases, the definite article may be considered superfluous as the referent is specified by definition (there is just one of them). Its presence can be accounted for by the assumption that they are shorthand for a longer phrase in which the name is a specifier, i.e. the Amazon River, the Hebridean Islands. Where the nouns in such longer phrases cannot be omitted, the definite article is universally kept: the United States, the People's Republic of China. Proper nouns that do not start with a definite article are called anarthrous proper nouns.

This distinction can sometimes become a political matter: the former usage the Ukraine stressed the word's Russian meaning of "borderlands"; as Ukraine became a fully independent state following the collapse of the Soviet Union, it requested that formal mentions of its name omit the article. Similar shifts in usage have occurred in the names of Sudan and both Congo (Brazzaville) and Congo (Kinshasa); a move in the other direction occurred with The Gambia. In certain languages, such as French and Italian, definite articles are used with all or most names of countries: la France, le Canada, l'Allemagne; l'Italia, la Spagna, il Brasile.

If a name [has] a definite article, e.g. the Kremlin, it cannot idiomatically be used without it: we cannot say Boris Yeltsin is in Kremlin.

— R. W. Burchfield

Some languages use definite articles with personal names, as in Portuguese (a Maria, literally: "the Maria"), Greek (η Μαρία, ο Γιώργος, ο Δούναβης, η Παρασκευή), and Catalan (la Núria, el/en Oriol). Such usage also occurs colloquially or dialectally in Spanish, German, French, Italian and other languages. In Hungarian, the colloquial use of definite articles with personal names, though widespread, is considered a Germanism.

The definite article sometimes appears in nicknames such as "the Donald" referring to US president Donald Trump, "the Gipper" referring to Ronald Reagan, "The Don" referring to cricketer Donald Bradman", "The Peacemaker" referring to Czar Alexander III, or "The Hoff" referring to David Hasselhoff.

=== Partitive article ===
A partitive article is a type of article, sometimes viewed as a type of indefinite article, used with a mass noun such as water, to indicate a non-specific quantity of it. Partitive articles are a class of determiner; they are used in French and Italian in addition to definite and indefinite articles. (In Finnish and Estonian, the partitive is indicated by inflection.) The nearest equivalent in English is some, although it is classified as a determiner, and English uses it less than French uses de.

French: Veux-tu du café ?
Do you want (some) coffee?

For more information, see the article on the French partitive article.

Haida has a partitive article (suffixed -gyaa) referring to "part of something or... to one or more objects of a given group or category," e.g., tluugyaa uu hal tlaahlaang "he is making a boat (a member of the category of boats)."

=== Negative article ===
A negative article specifies none of its noun, and can thus be regarded as neither definite nor indefinite. On the other hand, some consider such a word to be a simple determiner rather than an article. In English, this function is fulfilled by no, which can appear before a singular or plural noun:

No man has been on this island.
No dogs are allowed here.
No one is in the room.

In German, the negative article is, among other variations, kein, in opposition to the indefinite article ein.

Ein Hund – a dog
Kein Hund – no dog

The equivalent in Dutch is geen:

een hond – a dog
geen hond – no dog

=== Zero article ===
The zero article is the absence of an article. In languages having a definite article, the lack of an article specifically indicates that the noun is indefinite. Linguists interested in X-bar theory causally link zero articles to nouns lacking a determiner. In English, the zero article rather than the indefinite is used with plurals and mass nouns, although the word "some" can be used as an indefinite plural article.

Visitors end up walking in mud.

== Crosslinguistic variation ==
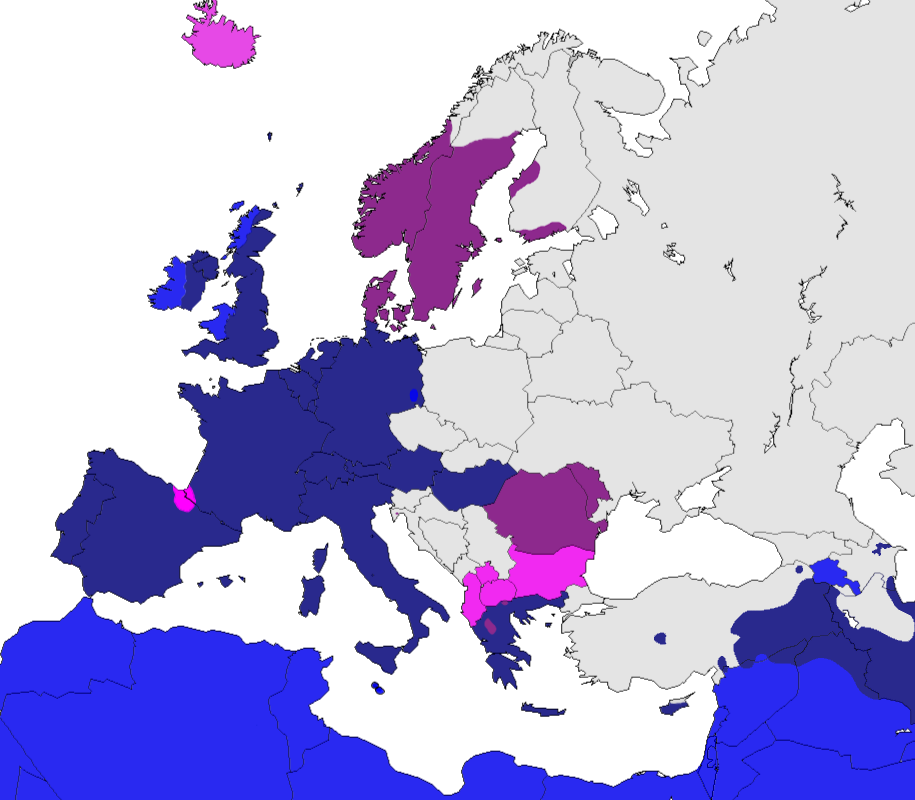
Articles in languages in and around Europe indefinite and definite articles only definite articles indefinite and suffixed definite articles only suffixed definite articles no articles

Articles are found in many Indo-European languages, Semitic languages, Polynesian languages, and even language isolates such as Basque; however, they are formally absent from many of the world's major languages including Chinese, Japanese, Korean, Mongolian, Tibetan, many Turkic languages (including Tatar, Bashkir, Tuvan and Chuvash), many Uralic languages (incl. Finnic (Note: Grammatically speaking Finnish has no articles, but the words se (it) and yks(i) (one) are used in colloquial Finnish in the same fashion as the and a/an in English and are, for all intents and purposes, treated like articles when used in this manner.) and Saami languages), Hindi-Urdu, Punjabi, the Dravidian languages (incl. Tamil, Telugu, and Kannada), the Baltic languages, the majority of Slavic languages, the Bantu languages (incl. Swahili). In some languages that do have articles, such as some North Caucasian languages, the use of articles is optional; however, in others like English and German it is mandatory in all cases.

Linguists believe the common ancestor of the Indo-European languages, Proto-Indo-European, did not have articles. Most of the languages in this family do not have definite or indefinite articles: there is no article in Latin or Sanskrit, nor in some modern Indo-European languages, such as the families of Slavic languages (except for Bulgarian and Macedonian, which are rather distinctive among the Slavic languages in their grammar, and some Northern Russian dialects), Baltic languages and many Indo-Aryan languages. Although Classical Greek had a definite article (which has survived into Modern Greek and which bears strong functional resemblance to the German definite article, which it is related to), the earlier Homeric Greek used this article largely as a pronoun or demonstrative, whereas the earliest known form of Greek known as Mycenaean Greek did not have any articles. Articles developed independently in several language families.

Not all languages have both definite and indefinite articles, and some languages have different types of definite and indefinite articles to distinguish finer shades of meaning: for example, French and Italian have a partitive article used for indefinite mass nouns, whereas Colognian has two distinct sets of definite articles indicating focus and uniqueness, and Macedonian uses definite articles in a demonstrative sense, with a tripartite distinction (proximal, medial, distal) based on distance from the speaker or interlocutor. The words this and that (and their plurals, these and those) can be understood in English as, ultimately, forms of the definite article the (whose declension in Old English included thaes, an ancestral form of this/that and these/those).

In many languages, the form of the article may vary according to the gender, number, or case of its noun. In some languages the article may be the only indication of the case. Many languages do not use articles at all, and may use other ways of indicating old versus new information, such as topic–comment constructions.

=== Tables ===
Variations of articles in definiteness and inflection among major languages
	Definite	Indefinite	Gendered	Numbered	Case-inflected
Afrikaans	Yes	Yes	No	No	No
Albanian	Yes, as suffixes	Yes	Yes	No	Yes
Arabic	Yes, as prefixes	Yes, as suffixes	No	No	No
Armenian	Yes, as suffixes	No	No	No	No
Basque	Yes, as suffixes	Yes	No	Yes	Yes
Belarusian	No	No	No	No	No
Bengali	Yes, as suffixes	Yes	No	Yes	No
Bulgarian	Yes, as suffixes	No	Yes	Yes	Only masculine singular
Catalan	Yes	Yes	Yes	Yes	No
Chinese	No	No	No	No	No
Czech	No	No	No	No	No
Danish	Yes, before adjectives or as suffixes	Yes	Yes	Yes (if definite)	No
Dutch	Yes	Yes	Yes (if definite)	Yes (if definite)	No, except for the genitive case
English	Yes	Yes	No	No	No
Esperanto	Yes	No	No	No	No
Estonian	No	No	No	No	No
Faroese	Yes, as suffixes	Yes	Yes	Yes	Yes
Finnish	No	No	No	No	No
French	Yes	Yes	Yes (if singular)	Yes	No
Georgian	No	No	No	No	No
German	Yes	Yes	Yes	Yes (if definite)	Yes
Greek	Yes	Yes	Yes	Yes (if definite)	Yes
Guarani	Yes	No	No	Yes	No
Hawaiian	Yes	Yes	No	Yes (if definite)	No
Hebrew	Yes, as prefixes	No	No	No	No
Hungarian	Yes	Yes	No	No	No
Icelandic	Yes, as suffixes	No	Yes	Yes	Yes
Interlingua	Yes	Yes	No	No	No
Irish	Yes	No	Yes	Yes	Yes
Italian	Yes	Yes	Yes	Yes	No
Japanese	No	No	No	No	No
Korean	No	No	No	No	No
Latvian	No	No	No	No	No
Lithuanian	No	No	No	No	No
Macedonian	Yes, as suffixes	No	Yes	Yes	No
Malay/Indonesian	Yes, as suffixes in the colloquial language	Yes	No	No	No
Nepali	No	Yes	Yes	Yes	No
Norwegian	Yes, before adjectives or as suffixes	Yes	Yes	Yes (if definite)	No
Pashto	No	Yes	Yes	No	Yes
Persian	Might be used optionally	Yes	No	No	No
Polish	No	No	No	No	No
Portuguese	Yes	Yes	Yes	Yes	No
Romanian	Yes, as suffixes	Yes	Yes	Yes	Yes
Russian	No	No	No	No	No
Sanskrit	No	No	No	No	No
Scottish Gaelic	Yes	No	Yes	Yes	Yes
Serbo-Croatian	No	No	No	No	No
Slovak	No	No	No	No	No
Slovene	No	No	No	No	No
Somali	Yes, as suffixes	No	Yes	No	Yes
Spanish	Yes	Yes	Yes	Yes	No
Swahili	No	No	No	No	No
Swedish	Yes, before adjectives or as suffixes	Yes	Yes	Yes (if definite)	No
Tamil	No	No	No	No	No
Thai	No	No	No	No	No
Toki Pona	No	No	No	No	No
Turkish	No	Might be used optionally	No	No	No
Ukrainian	No	No	No	No	No
Vietnamese	Yes	No	No	No	No
Welsh	Yes	No	Causes initial consonant mutation to singular feminine nouns	No	No
Yiddish	Yes	Yes	Yes	Yes (if definite)	Yes

The articles used in some languages
Language	definite article	partitive article	indefinite article
Abkhaz	a-	—N/a	-k
Afrikaans	die	—N/a	'n
Albanian	-a, -ja, -i, -ri, -ni, -u, -t, -in, -un, -n, -rin, -nin, -në, -ën, -s, -së, -ës, -të, -it, -ët (all suffixes)	disa	një
Arabic	al- or el ال (prefix)	—N/a	-n
Armenian	-ը -ë (in between consonants), -ն -n (elsewhere)	—N/a	մի mi
Assamese	-tû, -ta, -ti, -khôn, -khini, -zôn, -zôni, -dal, -zûpa etc.	—N/a	êta, êkhôn, êzôn, êzôni, êdal, êzûpa etc.
Bengali	-টা, -টি, -গুলো, -রা, -খানা (-ṭa, -ṭi, -gulo, -ra, -khana)	—N/a	একটি, একটা, কোন (ekôṭi, ekôṭa, konô)
Breton	an, al, ar	—N/a	un, ul, ur
Bulgarian	-та, -то, -а, -ът, -я, -ят, -те (all suffixes)	няколко	един/някакъв, една/някаква, едно/някакво, едни/някакви
Catalan	el, la, l', els, les ses, lo, los, es, sa	—N/a	un, una uns, unes
Cornish	an	—N/a	—N/a
Danish	Singular: -en, -n -et, -t (all suffixes) Plural: -ene, -ne (all suffixes)	—N/a	en, et
Dutch	de, het ('t); archaic since 1945/46 but still used in names and idioms: des, der, den	—N/a	een ('n)
English	the	—N/a	a, an
Esperanto	la	—N/a	—N/a
Faroese	-(i)n, -(i)ð, -(i)na, -num, -(i)ni, -(i)ns, -(i)nnar, -nir, -nar, -(u)num, -nna (all suffixes)	—N/a	ein, eitt, eina, einum, ein(ar)i, eins, einnar, einir, einar, eini, einna
Finnish (colloquial)	se	—N/a	yks(i)
French	le, la, l', les	de, d', du, de la, des, de l'	un, une, des
German	der, die, das des, dem, den	—N/a	ein, eine, einer, eines einem, einen
Greek	ο, η, το οι, οι, τα	—N/a	ένας, μια, ένα
Hawaiian	ka, ke nā	—N/a	he
Hebrew	ha- ה (prefix)	—N/a	—N/a
Hungarian	a, az	—N/a	egy
Icelandic	-(i)nn, -(i)n, -(i)ð, -(i)na, -num, -(i)nni, -nu, -(i)ns, -(i)nnar, -nir, -nar, -(u)num, -nna (all suffixes)	—N/a	—N/a
Interlingua	le	—N/a	un
Irish	an, na, a' (used colloquially)	—N/a	
Italian	il, lo, la, l' i, gli, le	del, dello, della, dell' dei, degli, degl', delle	un, uno, una, un'
Khasi	u, ka, i ki	—N/a	—N/a
Kurdish	-eke -ekan	hendê, birrê	-êk -anêk
Latin	—N/a	—N/a	—N/a
Luxembourgish	den, déi (d'), dat (d') dem, der	däers/es, däer/er	en, eng engem, enger
Macedonian	-от -ов -он -та -ва -на -то -во -но -те -ве -не -та -ва -на (all suffixes)	неколку	еден една едно едни
Manx	y, yn, 'n, ny	—N/a	—N/a
Malay and Indonesian	-nya (colloquial), before names: si (usually informal), sang (more formal)	—N/a	se- (+ classifiers)
Māori	te (singular), ngā (plural)	—N/a	he (also for "some")
Maltese	(i)l-, (i)ċ-, (i)d-, (i)n-, (i)r-, (i)s-, (i)t-, (i)x-, (i)z-, (i)ż- (all prefixes)	—N/a	—N/a
Nepali	—N/a	—N/a	euta, euti, ek, anek, kunai एउटा, एउटी, एक, अनेक, कुनै
Norwegian (Bokmål)	Singular: -en, -et, -a (all suffixes) Plural: -ene, -a (all suffixes)	—N/a	en, et, ei
Norwegian (Nynorsk)	Singular: -en, -et, -a (all suffixes) Plural: -ane, -ene, -a (all suffixes)	—N/a	ein, eit, ei
Papiamento	e	—N/a	un
Pashto	—N/a	—N/a	yaow, yaowə, yaowa, yaowey يو, يوهٔ, يوه, يوې
Persian	in, ān (prepositive) -e (suffixed)	—N/a	ye(k) (prepositive) -i (suffixed)
Portuguese	o, a os, as	—N/a	um, uma uns, umas
Quenya	i, in, 'n	—N/a	—N/a
Romanian	-(u)l, -le, -(u)a -(u)lui, -i, -lor (all suffixes)	—N/a	un, o unui, unei niște, unor
Scots	the	—N/a	a
Scottish Gaelic	an, am, a', na, nam, nan	—N/a	—N/a
Sindarin	i, in, -in, -n, en	—N/a	—N/a
Spanish	el, la, lo, los, las	—N/a	un, una unos, unas
Swedish	Singular: -en, -n, -et, -t (all suffixes) Plural: -na, -a, -en (all suffixes)	—N/a	en, ett
Welsh	y, yr, -'r	—N/a	—N/a
Yiddish	דער (der), די (di), דאָס (dos), דעם (dem)	—N/a	אַ (a), אַן (an)

The following examples show articles which are always suffixed to the noun:

- Albanian: zog, a bird; zogu, the bird
- Aramaic: שלם (shalam), peace; שלמא (shalma), the peace
  - Note: Aramaic is written from right to left, so an Aleph is added to the end of the word. ם becomes מ when it is not the final letter.
- Assamese: "কিতাপ (kitap)", book; "কিতাপখন (kitapkhôn)": "The book"
- Bengali: "বই (bôi)", book; "বইটি (bôiti)/বইটা (bôita)/বইখানা (bôikhana)" : "The Book"
- Bulgarian: стол stol, chair; столът stolǎt, the chair (subject); стола stola, the chair (object)
- Danish: hus, house; huset, the house; if there is an adjective: det gamle hus, the old house
- Icelandic: hestur, horse; hesturinn, the horse
- Macedonian: стол stol, chair; столот stolot, the chair; столов stolov, this chair; столон stolon, that chair
- Persian: sib, apple. (There is no definite articles in the Standard Persian. It has one indefinite article 'yek' that means 'one'. In Standard Persian, if a noun is not indefinite, it is a definite noun. 'Sib e' man' means 'my apple'. Here, 'e' is like 'of' in English, so literally 'sib e man' means 'the apple of mine'. However, in Iranian Persian, "-e" is used as a definite article, quite different from Standard Persian. pesar, boy; pesare, the boy; pesare in'o be'm dād, the boy gave me this.)
- Romanian: drum, road; drumul, the road (the article is just "l", "u" is a "connection vowel" Romanian: vocală de legătură)
- Swedish and Norwegian: hus, house; huset, the house; if there is an adjective: det gamle (N)/gamla (S) huset, the old house

Examples of prefixed definite articles:

- Hebrew: ילד, transcribed as yeled, a boy; הילד, transcribed as hayeled, the boy
- Maltese: ktieb, a book; il-ktieb, the book; Maltese: għotja, a donation; l-għotja, the donation; Maltese: ċavetta, a key; iċ-ċavetta, the key; Maltese: dar, a house; id-dar, the house; Maltese: nemla, an ant; in-nemla, the ant; Maltese: ras, a head; ir-ras, the head; Maltese: sodda, a bed; is-sodda, the bed; Maltese: tuffieħa, an apple; it-tuffieħa, the apple; Maltese: xahar, a month; ix-xahar, the month; Maltese: zunnarija, a carrot; iz-zunnarija, the carrot; Maltese: żmien, a time; iż-żmien, the time

A different way, limited to the definite article, is used by Latvian and Lithuanian. The noun does not change but the adjective can be defined or undefined. In Latvian: galds, a table / the table; balts galds, a white table; baltais galds, the white table. In Lithuanian: stalas, a table / the table; baltas stalas, a white table; baltasis stalas, the white table.

Languages in the above table written in italics are constructed languages and are not natural, that is to say that they have been purposefully invented by an individual (or group of individuals) with some purpose in mind.

=== Tokelauan ===
When using a definite article in Tokelauan language, unlike in some languages like English, if the speaker is speaking of an item, they need not have referred to it previously as long as the item is specific. This is also true when it comes to the reference of a specific person. So, although the definite article used to describe a noun in the Tokelauan language is te, it can also translate to the indefinite article in languages that requires the item being spoken of to have been referenced prior. When translating to English, te could translate to the English definite article the, or it could also translate to the English indefinite article a. An example of how the definite article te can be used as an interchangeable definite or indefinite article in the Tokelauan language would be the sentence “Kua hau te tino”. In the English language, this could be translated as “A man has arrived” or “The man has arrived” where using te as the article in this sentence can represent any man or a particular man. The word he, which is the indefinite article in Tokelauan, is used to describe ‘any such item’, and is encountered most often with negatives and interrogatives. An example of the use of he as an indefinite article is “Vili ake oi k'aumai he toki ”, where ‘he toki ’ mean ‘an axe’. The use of he and te in Tokelauan are reserved for when describing a singular noun. However, when describing a plural noun, different articles are used. For plural definite nouns, rather than te, the article nā is used. ‘Vili ake oi k'aumai nā nofoa’ in Tokelauan would translate to “Do run and bring me the chairs” in English. There are some special cases in which instead of using nā, plural definite nouns have no article before them. The absence of an article is represented by 0. One way that it is usually used is if a large amount or a specific class of things are being described. Occasionally, such as if one was describing an entire class of things in a nonspecific fashion, the singular definite noun te would is used. In English, ‘Ko te povi e kai mutia’ means “Cows eat grass”. Because this is a general statement about cows, te is used instead of nā. The ko serves as a preposition to the “te” The article ni is used for describing a plural indefinite noun. ‘E i ei ni tuhi?’ translates to “Are there any books?”

== Historical development ==
Articles often develop by specialization of adjectives or determiners. Their development is often a sign of languages becoming more analytic instead of synthetic, perhaps combined with the loss of inflection as in English, Romance languages, Bulgarian, Macedonian and Torlakian.

Joseph Greenberg in Universals of Human Language describes "the cycle of the definite article": Definite articles (Stage I) evolve from demonstratives, and in turn can become generic articles (Stage II) that may be used in both definite and indefinite contexts, and later merely noun markers (Stage III) that are part of nouns other than proper names and more recent borrowings. Eventually articles may evolve anew from demonstratives.

=== Definite articles ===
Definite articles typically arise from demonstratives meaning that. For example, the definite articles in most Romance languages—e.g., el, il, le, la, lo, a, o — derive from the Latin demonstratives ille (masculine), illa (feminine) and illud (neuter).

The English definite article the, written þe in Middle English, derives from an Old English demonstrative, which, according to gender, was written se (masculine), seo (feminine) (þe and þeo in the Northumbrian dialect), or þæt (neuter). The neuter form þæt also gave rise to the modern demonstrative that. The ye occasionally seen in pseudo-archaic usage such as "Ye Olde Englishe Tea Shoppe" is actually a form of þe, where the letter thorn (þ) came to be written as a y.

Multiple demonstratives can give rise to multiple definite articles. Macedonian, for example, in which the articles are suffixed, has столот (stolot), the chair; столов (stolov), this chair; and столон (stolon), that chair. These derive from the Proto-Slavic demonstratives *tъ "this, that", *ovъ "this here" and *onъ "that over there, yonder" respectively. Colognian prepositions articles such as in dat Auto, or et Auto, the car; the first being specifically selected, focused, newly introduced, while the latter is not selected, unfocused, already known, general, or generic.

Standard Basque distinguishes between proximal and distal definite articles in the plural (dialectally, a proximal singular and an additional medial grade may also be present). The Basque distal form (with infix -a-, etymologically a suffixed and phonetically reduced form of the distal demonstrative har-/hai-) functions as the default definite article, whereas the proximal form (with infix -o-, derived from the proximal demonstrative hau-/hon-) is marked and indicates some kind of (spatial or otherwise) close relationship between the speaker and the referent (e.g., it may imply that the speaker is included in the referent): etxeak ("the houses") vs. etxeok ("these houses [of ours]"), euskaldunak ("the Basque speakers") vs. euskaldunok ("we, the Basque speakers").

Speakers of Assyrian Neo-Aramaic, a modern Aramaic language that lacks a definite article, may at times use demonstratives aha and aya (feminine) or awa (masculine) – which translate to "this" and "that", respectively – to give the sense of "the". In Indonesian, the third person possessive suffix -nya could be also used as a definite article.

=== Indefinite articles ===
Indefinite articles typically arise from adjectives meaning one. For example, the indefinite articles in the Romance languages—e.g., un, una, une—derive from the Latin adjective unus. Partitive articles, however, derive from Vulgar Latin de illo, meaning (some) of the.

The English indefinite article an is derived from the same root as one. The -n came to be dropped before consonants, giving rise to the shortened form a. The existence of both forms has led to many cases of juncture loss, for example transforming the original a napron into the modern an apron.

The Persian indefinite article is yek, meaning one.

== See also ==
- English articles
- Al- (definite article in Arabic)
- Definiteness
- Definite description
- False title
