= Catalan grammar =

Morphology and syntax of Catalan

Catalan grammar, the morphology and syntax of the Catalan language, is similar to the grammar of most other Romance languages. Catalan is a relatively synthetic, fusional language.

Features include:

- Use of definite and indefinite articles.
- Nouns, adjectives, pronouns and articles are inflected for gender (masculine and feminine) and number (singular and plural). The numerals 'one', 'two' and the numeral 'hundred' from two-hundred onwards are also inflected for gender.
- Highly inflected verbs, for person, number, tense, aspect, and mood (including a subjunctive).
- Word order is freer than in English.

Some distinctive features of Catalan among Romance languages include the general lack of masculine markers (like Italian, Spanish, or Portuguese -o), a trait shared with French and Occitan; and the fact that the remote preterite tense of verbs is usually formed with a periphrasis consisting of the verb "to go" plus infinitive.

== Articles ==
Catalan has two types of article, definite and indefinite. They are declined for gender and number, and must agree with the noun they qualify. As with other Romance languages, Catalan articles are subject to complex elision and contraction processes.

The inflection of articles is complex, especially because of frequent elision, but is similar to neighboring languages. Catalan has more preposition–article contractions than Spanish, like dels ("of + the [plural]"), but fewer than Italian (which has sul, col, nel, etc.).

=== Definite ===
The tables below summarize the forms of the definite article, its elisions, and its contractions.

Definite article (elided forms in brackets)
	masculine	feminine
singular	el (l')	la (l')
plural	els	les

Contractions of the definite article
		preposition		
		a	de	per
article	el	al (a l')	del (de l')	pel (per l')
article	els	als	dels	pels

==== Masculine forms ====
- The masculine singular form is el. The initial vowel is elided before a vowel or h, yielding to l'.

El pare. L'avi.
"The father." "The grandfather."

- El is not elided if the word begins with semivocalic (h)i- [j].

El iode. El hiat.
"The iodine." "The hiatus"

- The masculine plural form is els. Both el and els combine with the prepositions a "to", de "of", and per "for", yielding the contractions al, als, del, dels, pel, pels.

Ho dic al pare.
"I say it to the father." ("I say it to my father")
Això és del noi.
"This is of the boy." ("This belongs to the boy")
Corria pels camins.
"I ran through the paths." ("I ran along the paths")

- El does not contract with the aforementioned prepositions if the following word begins with vowel or h.

Porta-ho a l'avi.
"Bring this to the grandfather."
Baixa de l'arbre.
"Get down from the tree."

==== Feminine forms ====
- The feminine singular form is la. The final vowel is elided before a vowel or h, yielding l'.

La mare. L'àvia
"The mother." "The grandmother"

- La is not contracted if the word begins with unstressed (h)i-, or (h)u-.

La idea. La hipòtesi. La unitat. La humitat.
"The idea." "The hypothesis." "The unit." "The humidity."

- La is not elided with the words una "one (hour)", host "hueste", and ira "wrath"; as well as with words beginning with the Greek prefix a-, like asimetria "asymmetry".
- The feminine plural form is les.
- Feminine articles are not contracted with prepositions.

==== Articles for personal names ====
Forenames and surnames must carry a definite article. In addition to the ordinary singular forms, alternative forms derived from the Latin vocative domine can be used. The elision rules are the same for el and la.

Personal article (elided forms in brackets)
masculine	feminine
en (n')	na (n')

El Joan. L'Andreu. La Mercè. La Isabel. L'Olga.
En Joan. N'Andreu. Na Mercè. Na Isabel. N'Olga.

==== Dialectal variation ====
In Western Catalonia the dialectal versions lo and los are used instead of el and els.

In some regions, especially in the Balearic islands, the definite article derives from the Latin determiner ipse. These forms are referred to as articles salats. Similar forms are found in Sardinian and some varieties of Occitan.

Balearic definite article
	masculine	feminine
singular	es (s')	sa (s')
plural	es, ets	ses

Balearic definite article + amb (with)
	masculine	feminine
singular	amb so	amb sa (amb s')
plural	amb sos	amb ses

=== Indefinite ===
The table below summarize the forms of the indefinite article. Indefinite articles are not elided nor contracted.

Indefinite article
	masculine	feminine
singular	un	una
plural	uns	unes

== Overview of gender and number inflection ==
Most adjectives, and a fair number of nouns, inflect for gender. This usually follows a regular pattern of endings. The two main patterns are generally referred to as "four-form" and "two-form" adjectives. Four-form adjectives have distinct masculine and feminine forms, whereas two-form adjectives have the same form for both masculine and feminine. They are derived from the Latin first/second, and the third declension respectively. Many nouns follow the four-form inflection, but some may follow the two-form inflection. Some are irregular in some way.

Four-form adjective verd ("green")
	masculine	feminine
singular	verd	verda
plural	verds	verdes

Two-form adjective indiferent ("indifferent")
	masculine	feminine
singular	indiferent	
plural	indiferents	

Similar to French, but unlike Portuguese, Spanish or Italian, the Latin/Romance final -o and -e have disappeared. Thus, the alternance of -o/-a in the four-form words has been substituted by -/-a. There are only a few exceptions, like minso/minsa ("scarce").

Among nouns, Catalan has few suppletive couplets, like Italian and Spanish, and unlike French. Thus, Catalan has noi/noia ("boy"/"girl") and gall/gallina ("cock"/"chicken"), whereas French has garçon/fille and coq/poule.

There is a tendency to inflect adjectives as four-form instead of two-form, something that is prevalent in Occitan and standard in French. Thus, alongside traditional two-form bullent/bullent ("boiling"), one can also find four-form bullent/bullenta.

=== Variants ===
Many not completely predictable morphological alternations may occur between masculine and feminine, like:

- Affrication: boig/boja ("insane") vs. lleig/lletja ("ugly")
- Loss of n: pla/plana ("flat") vs. segon/segona ("second")
- Final obstruent devoicing: sentit/sentida ("felt") vs. dit/dita ("said") vs. fred/freda ("cold")

In words that end in a sibilant sound, the masculine plural ending is -os instead of just -s. Feminines still have -es or, if they follow the two-form declension, no ending at all. Compare: el pols/els polsos ("the pulse"/"the pulses") vs. la pols/les pols ("the dust"/"the dusts").

Adjectives that end in -aç, -iç, or -oç follow the two-form declension in the singular, but four-form in the plural, so that they actually have three forms:

Adjective in -aç, -iç, or -oç feliç ("happy")
	masculine	feminine
singular	feliç	
plural	feliços	felices

== Nouns ==
Catalan nouns are inflected for gender (masculine or feminine), and number (singular or plural). There is no case inflection. Articles and adjectives agree in gender and number with the noun they refer to.

Usually, masculine nouns are unmarked, feminine nouns carry the suffix -a; and the plural is marked with the suffix -s, which makes the feminine ending turn into -e-. Thus, the most common declension paradigm for Catalan names is the one that follows:

Example: declension of gat "cat"
	masculine	feminine
singular	gat	gata
plural	gats	gates

=== Gender inflection ===
The grammatical gender of a Catalan noun does not necessarily correspond with the real-life object's biological sex (or lack thereof). Nouns denoting a person, such as home "man" or dona "woman", generally agree with the natural gender of what is described. However, Catalan assigns gender to nouns without natural gender in arbitrary fashion. For example, the word tamboret ("stool") is masculine, while the word cadira ("chair") is feminine.

==== Living beings with distinct masculine and feminine forms ====
Living beings of the same species usually are designed by two nouns: one of masculine grammatical gender for biologically male individuals, and one of feminine grammatical gender for biologically female individuals. Both names, masculine and feminine, are usually only differentiated by their ending; sometimes the second is derived from the first or vice versa. Rarely, both come from different roots.

===== Formation of the feminine form from the masculine =====
- Most times the feminine form is created by appending the suffix -a to the unmarked masculine form.

Noi → noia. Avi → àvia.
"Boy – girl." "Grandfather – grandmother."

- If the masculine form ends in -t, -p, -f, -s, the addition of the feminine suffix -a may cause these consonants to become voiced to -d-, -b-, -v-, -s-; or not. There are no rules to deduce the change.

	becomes voiced			remains unvoiced		
change	masculine	feminine	gloss	masculine	feminine	gloss
⟨-t⟩ → ⟨-d-⟩ /t/ → /ð/	nebot	neboda	"nephew – niece"	nét	neta	"grandson – granddaughter"
⟨-p⟩ → ⟨-b-⟩ /p/ → /β/	llop	lloba	"wolf"			
⟨-f⟩ → ⟨-v-⟩ /f/ → /v~β/	serf	serva	"serf"			
⟨-s⟩ → ⟨-s-⟩ /s/ → /z/	espòs	esposa	"husband – wife"	gos	gossa	"dog – bitch"

- If the masculine form ends in a stressed vowel, the feminine is created by appending the suffix -na.

Germà → germana
"Brother – sister."

- Sometimes the feminine form is created by appending the suffix -essa to the unmarked masculine form.

Sacerdot → sacerdotessa.
"Priest – priestess."

===== Formation of the masculine form from the feminine =====
- Sometimes the masculine form is created from the feminine by changing the suffix a for -ot.

Bruixot ← bruixa.
"Sorcerer — witch."

==== Living beings with indistinct masculine and feminine forms ====
- Sometimes a single noun is used to designate both masculine and feminine beings. To specify the biological gender of the being, the adjectives mascle "male", and femella "female" are used.

El rossinyol. El rossinyol mascle. El rossinyol femella.
" The nightingale." "The male nightingale." "The female nightingale"

==== Objects, abstract concepts ====
- Since objects and abstract concepts have no biological gender, all of them only have one form. The gender of inanimate nouns is assigned arbitrarily. Sometimes the choice may seem contradictory.

La virilitat (f).
"The manliness."

- Sometimes synonymous words may have different genders.

El televisor (m) – la televisió (f). L'argent (m) – la plata (f)
"The TV." "The silver."

==== Homophonous words with different genders ====
- Some homonymous words may have different genders according to their meaning.

El clau (m) – la clau (f)
"The nail – the key."

=== Number inflection ===
Like all the Western Romance languages, the formation of the plural involves the addition of the suffix -s to the singular. However, the stem may undergo some changes. The number inflection of adjectives follows the same rules.

- Most times the plural form is created by appending the suffix -s to the singular form.
  Pare → pares. Avi → avis.
  "Father – fathers." "Grandfather – grandfathers."
- If the singular ends in -a, the plural is usually formed with -es. Most of these nouns are feminine, but some are masculine.
  Casa → cases (f). Problema → problemes (m).
  "House – houses." "Problem – problems"
  - However, if the singular ends in -ga, -ca, -gua, -qua, -ça, -ja, the plural is formed by -gues, -ques, -gües, -qües, -ces, -ges. This is done for orthographical reasons, and stem pronunciation remains identical in the singular and plural.

sound	transformation	singular (stem underlined)	plural (stem underlined)	IPA transcription	gloss
/ɣ/	⟨g⟩ → ⟨gu⟩	farga	fargues	/ˈfaɾɡə/, /ˈfaɾɡəs/ /ˈfaɾɡa/, /ˈfaɾɡes/	"forge(s)"
/k/	⟨c⟩ → ⟨qu⟩	oca	oques	/ˈɔkə/, /ˈɔkəs/ /ˈɔka/, /ˈɔkes/	"goose – geese"
/ɣw/	⟨gu⟩ → ⟨gü⟩	llengua	llengües	/ˈʎeŋɡwə/, /ˈʎeŋɡwəs/ /ˈʎeŋɡwa/, /ˈʎeŋɡwes/	"tongue(s)"
/kw/	⟨qu⟩ → ⟨qü⟩	pasqua	pasqües	/ˈpaskwə/, /ˈpaskwəs/ /ˈpaskwa/, /ˈpaskwes/	"Easter(s)"
/s/	⟨ç⟩ → ⟨c⟩	plaça	places	/ˈplasə/, /ˈplasəs/ /ˈplasa/, /ˈplases/	"square(s)"
/ʒ/ /d͡ʒ/	⟨j⟩ → ⟨g⟩	pluja	pluges	/ˈpluʒə/, /ˈpluʒəs/ /ˈplud͡ʒa/, /ˈplud͡ʒes/	"rain(s)"
/d͡ʒ/ /d͡ʒː/	⟨j⟩ → ⟨g⟩	platja	platges	/ˈplad͡ʒə/, /ˈplad͡ʒəs/ /ˈplad͡ːʒa/, /ˈplad͡ːʒes/	"beach(es)"

- If the singular form ends in a stressed vowel, the plural is usually created by appending the suffix -ns.
  Pa → pans (m). Capità → capitans (m). Acció → accions (f).
  "Bread – breads." "Captain – captains." "Action – actions."
  - However, some words ending in a stressed vowel form their plural in -s. Many of them are relatively recent loanwords not directly inherited from late Latin.
    Sofà → sofàs. Bambú → bambús.
    "Sofa – sofas." "Bamboo – bamboos."
  - A few nouns ending in unstressed -e can also form their plural alternatively in -ns. It is considered archaic or dialectal.
    Home → homes or hòmens. Orfe → orfes or òrfens
    "Man – men." "Orphan – orphans."
- Many masculine nouns ending in -s, ç form their plural with -os. -s- becomes voiced in the plural, but -ç- remains unvoiced.
  Gas → gasos /ˈgas – ˈgazus ~ ˈgazos/. Braç → braços /ˈbɾas – ˈbɾasus ~ ˈbɾasos/.
  "Gas – gases." "Arm – arms."
  - In some masculine nouns ending in -s, this remains unvoiced when adding -os, and thus becomes -ss-:
    - Most polysyllabic masculine words ending in -às, -ís, ús.
      Fracàs → fracassos. Pastís → pastissos. Barnús → barnussos
      "Failure – failures." "Cake – cakes." "Bathrobe – bathrobes"
    - Most masculine words ending in -os, -ós, òs.
      Gos → gossos. Arròs → arrossos. Os → ossos.
      "Dog – dogs." "Rice – rices." "Bear – bears". (also "Bone – bones").
- Masculine paroxytone and proparoxytone nouns ending in -s are invariable.
  Llapis → llapis. Òmnibus – òmnibus
  "Pencil – pencils." "Omnibus – omnibuses."
- Feminine nouns ending in an s-like sound (-s, -ç, -x, -z) have a plural that is pronounced the same as the singular. If the noun ends in -s, no ending is added. Otherwise, an unpronounced -s is added.
  Pols → pols.
  "Dust – dusts."
  Calç → calçs /ˈkals/.
  "Lime – limes."
- Nouns ending in -x pronounced /ks/ form plurals according to word stress. If the noun is stressed on the last syllable, the plural suffix is -os. Otherwise, the ending is -s and the plural form is homophonous with the singular.
  Reflex → reflexos /rəˈflɛksus ~ reˈflɛksos/. Índex → índexs /ˈindəks ~ ˈindeks/.
  "Reflection – reflections." "Index – indexes."
- Nouns ending in -x pronounced /ʃ/ form their plural with -os.
  Calaix → calaixos.
  "Drawer – drawers."
- Nouns ending in -ig (/tʃ/) can form their plural in two ways, both acceptable:
  - Adding -s. Both forms will be homophonous. This is the preferred form in normative grammars, not so in general spoken use.
    Faig → faigs /ˈfatʃ/. Passeig → passeigs /pəˈsɛtʃ ~ paˈsetʃ/.
  - Replacing -ig with jos or tjos. There are no rules to deduce which is to be used.
    Faig → fajos /ˈfat͡ʃ – ˈfaʒus ~ ˈfad͡ʒos/. Mig → mitjos. /ˈmit͡ʃ – ˈmidʒus ~ mid͡ːʒos/.
    "Beech – beeches." "Half – halves."
- Nouns ending in -sc, -st, -xt can form their plural in two ways, both acceptable: Adding -s (preferred), or adding -os.
  Bosc → boscs or boscos. Gust → gusts or gustos. Pretext → pretexts or pretextos
  "Forest – forests." "Taste – tastes." "Pretext – pretexts."
- Feminine nouns ending in -st always form the plural by adding -s.
  Host → hosts.
  "Army – armies."

Unlike Spanish, but like French and Italian, in Catalan the participle can agree in gender and number when the direct object (which can be replaced by the pronouns el/lo, la, els/los, les) comes before the verb in compound tenses with the verb “haver”:

- He vist el teu amic. → L'he vist.
- He vist la teva amiga. → L'he vista.
- He vist els teus amics. → Els he vistos.
- He vist les teves amigues. → Les he vistes.

If the direct object comes after the verb, the participle does not change, so “he vista la teva amiga*” would be incorrect. Furthermore, this also does not occur with the pronouns ho and en/ne. Note that Catalan never uses the preposition “a” for the direct object, unlike Spanish, which uses it with people (“He vist al teu amic*” or “He vist a la teva amiga*” would be incorrect in Catalan).

Also keep in mind that Catalan only has “haver” as an auxiliary verb and not “ésser,” as in French or Italian. The Catalan perfect tense is formed exclusively with “haver,” just as in Spanish. The perfect tense (“He anat”) is used for recent actions, the periphrastic past (“Vaig anar”) for distant actions, and the simple past (“Aní”) is limited to certain dialects but is still present in literature and serves the same purpose as the periphrastic past.

== Adjectives ==
A Catalan adjective must agree in gender and number with the noun it accompanies. Most adjectives are placed after the nouns. Adjectives can be divided into three declension paradigms. The number inflection rules are the same as the nouns.

=== Declension ===
Catalan adjectives can be divided in three groups according to the distinct forms it has.

Adjective with 4 forms: verd "green"
	masculine	feminine
singular	verd	verda
plural	verds	verdes

Adjective with 3 forms: feliç "happy"
	masculine	feminine
singular	feliç	
plural	feliços	felices

Adjective with 2 forms: indiferent "indifferent"
	masculine	feminine
singular	indiferent	
plural	indiferents	

==== Formation of the feminine singular from the masculine singular ====
In adjectives with distinct feminine singular form, the masculine is usually unmarked for gender, and ends in a consonant. The feminine singular form of regular adjectives can be created from the masculine singular.

===== Unmarked masculine forms =====
- Most times the feminine form is created by appending the suffix -a to the unmarked masculine form.

Sec – seca. Fred – freda. Continu – contínua.
"Dry." "Cold." "Continuous."

- If the masculine form ends in -t, -c, -s, the addition of the feminine suffix -a may cause these consonants to become voiced to -d-, -g-, -s-; or not. There are no rules governing this change.

Voicing alternations
	becomes voiced			remains unvoiced		
change	masculine	feminine	gloss	masculine	feminine	gloss
⟨-t⟩ → ⟨-d-⟩ /t/ → /ð/	buit	buida	"empty"	lent	lenta	"slow"
⟨-c⟩ → ⟨-g-⟩ /k/ → /ɣ/	groc	groga	"yellow"	ric	rica	"rich"
⟨-s⟩ → ⟨-s-⟩ /s/ → /z/	obès	obesa	"obese"	gras	grassa	"fat"

- If the masculine form ends in a stressed vowel, the feminine is created by appending the suffix -na.; except nu "nude" and cru "raw".

Pla – plana. Rodó – rodona.
"Flat." "Round."

- If the masculine form ends in -au, -eu, -iu, and -ou; the feminine is formed with -ava, -ea, -iva, and -ova.

Blau – blava. Europeu – europea. Viu – viva. Nou – nova.
"Blue." "European." "Alive." "New."

===== Marked masculine forms ending in -e or -o =====
If the masculine form ends in -e or -o, the final vowel is substituted with -a. Many of the adjectives ending in -o come from Spanish.

Ample – ampla. Maco – maca (Cf. Sp. "majo").
"Wide." "Nice."

==== Adjectives with indistinct masculine and feminine forms ====
Some adjectives may have the same form in the masculine singular and feminine singular.

- Adjectives ending in -aç, -iç, and -oç.

Capaç – capaç. Feliç – feliç. Precoç – precoç.
"Capable." "Happy." "Precocious."

- Adjectives ending in stressed -al, stressed -el, and stressed or unstressed -il.

Central – central. Rebel – rebel. Hostil – hostil. Mòbil – mòbil.
"Central." "Rebel." "Hostile." "Mobile."

- Adjectives ending in -ar.

Vulgar – Vulgar
"Vulgar"

==== Irregular feminine forms ====
Some feminine adjectives are formed irregularly and do not adhere to the aforementioned formation rules.

Common Catalan irregular adjectives
masculine	feminine	gloss
oblic	obliqua	"oblique"
boig	boja	"insane"
roig	roja	"red"
lleig	lletja	"ugly"
mig	mitja	"half"
nul	nul·la	"null"
tranquil	tranquil·la	"quiet"
cru	crua	"raw"
nu	nua	"nude"
jueu	jueva/jueua	"Jewish"
sueu	sueva/sueua	"Suebian"
mal	mala	"bad"
paral·lel	paral·lela	"parallel"
car	cara	"expensive"
clar	clara	"clear"
avar	avara	"avaricious"
rar	rara	"rare"

=== Degrees of comparison ===
Degrees of comparison are expressed with a construction implying the adverb més "more" or menys "less":

- Més ... que ("more ... than")

Sóc més alt que tu.
"I am taller than you."

- El més ... de ("the most ... of")

Sóc el més alt de tots
"I am the tallest of all".

- Menys ... que ("less ... than")

Sóc menys alt que tu.
"I am less tall than you."

=== Absolute superlative ===
Like many other Romance languages, Catalan adjectives have an absolute superlative form, expressed with the suffix -íssim, placed between the stem and the gender / number suffix.

Aquest home és altíssim.
"This man is very very tall."

Aquestes dones són altíssimes.
"These women are very very tall."

== Adverbs ==
Catalan adverbs, like their English counterparts, are used to modify adjectives, other adverbs, and verbs or clauses. They do not display any inflection; that is, their form does not change to reflect their precise role, nor any characteristics of what they modify.

=== Formation ===
In Catalan, as in English, most adverbs are derived from adjectives. In most cases, this is done by adding the suffix -ment ("-ly") to the adjective's feminine singular form. For example, the feminine singular form of lent ("slow") is lenta, so the corresponding adverb is lentament ("slowly").

As in English, however, the adjective stem is sometimes modified to accommodate the suffix:

And, as in English, many common adverbs are not derived from adjectives at all:

així ("thus", "so").
ahir ("yesterday").

=== Placement ===
The placement of Catalan adverbs is almost the same as the placement of English adverbs.

An adverb that modifies an adjective or adverb comes before that adjective or adverb:

completament cert ("completely true").
massa ben fet ("too well done").

An adverb that modifies an infinitive (verbal noun) generally comes after the infinitive:

caminar lentament ("to walk slowly").

An adverb that modifies a main verb or clause comes either after the verb, or before the clause:

Lentament ell comença a caminar or Ell comença lentament a caminar ("Slowly, he begins to walk" or "He begins slowly to walk").

Note that, unlike in English, this is true even of negative adverbs:

Mai jo no he fet això or Jo no he fet mai això ("Never have I done that" or "I have never done that").

== Possessives ==
=== Possessive pronouns ===
Possessive pronouns are inflected for person and number of the possessor, and for gender and number of the possession. The table below summarizes all the possible forms.

Possessive pronouns
		singular		plural	
		masculine	feminine	masculine	feminine
singular	first	meu	meva meua	meus	meves meues
singular	second	teu	teva teua	teus	teves teues
singular	third	seu	seva seua	seus	seves seues
plural	first	nostre	nostra	nostres	
plural	second	vostre	vostra	vostres	
plural	third	seu	seva seua	seus	seves seues

El cotxe és meu.
"The car is mine."

The feminine forms meva, teva, and seva may appear dialectally with /w/ instead of /β ~ v/: meua, teua, and seua. Their plural forms follow the same variation (meues, teues, and seues).

=== Possessive adjectives ===
Possessive adjectives are, like the possessive pronouns, inflected for person and number of the possessor, and for gender and number of the possession. The table below summarizes all the possible forms. Notice how the plural possessor forms are identical to the possessive pronoun forms.

Possessive adjectives
		singular		plural	
		masculine	feminine	masculine	feminine
singular	first	mon	ma	mos	mes
singular	second	ton	ta	tos	tes
singular	third	son	sa	sos	ses
plural	first	nostre	nostra	nostres	
plural	second	vostre	vostra	vostres	
plural	third	llur		llurs	

Central Catalan has abandoned almost completely unstressed possessives (mon, etc.) in favour of constructions of article + stressed forms (el meu, etc.), a feature shared with Italian and Portuguese.

- Unstressed forms are rarely used in the spoken language, and are only retained for family relatives and set phrases.

Ton pare. Son avi.
"Your father." "His / her grandfather."

En ma vida.
"In my whole life."

- Instead of this, a construction of definite article + possessive pronoun + noun is preferred.

Mon cotxe. (literary, archaic)
El meu cotxe. (more common)
"My car."

== Pronouns ==
=== Personal pronouns ===
The morphology of Catalan personal pronouns is complex, specially in unstressed forms, which are numerous (13 distinct forms, compared to 11 in Spanish or 9 in Italian; French has such a different system that comparisons are not feasible). Features include the neuter gender (ho) and the great degree of freedom when combining different unstressed pronouns (65 combinations).

This flexibility allows Catalan to use extraposition extensively, much more than French or Spanish. Thus, Catalan can have m'hi recomanaren ("they recommended me to him"), whereas in French one must say ils m'ont recommendé à lui, and in Spanish me recomendaron a él. This allows the placement of almost any nominal term as a sentence topic, without having to use so often the passive voice (as in French or English), or identifying the direct object with a preposition (as in Spanish).

Catalan stressed pronouns
		singular	plural
first person		jo, mi	nosaltres
second person	informal	tu	vosaltres
second person	respectful	vós Archaic in most dialects.	
second person	formal	vostè vosté	vostès vostés
third person	masculine	ell	ells
third person	feminine	ella	elles

Catalan unstressed pronouns (only full forms)
			singular	plural
first person	accusative, dative, reflexive		em	ens
second person	accusative, dative, reflexive		et	us
third person	accusative	masculine	el	els
third person	accusative	feminine	la	les
third person	objective neuter		ho	—
third person	dative		li	els
third person	reflexive		es	
adverbial	ablative, genitive		en	
adverbial	locative		hi	

== Verbs ==
Catalan verbs express an action or a state of being of a given subject, and like verbs in most of the Indo-European languages, Catalan verbs undergo inflection according to the following categories:

- Tense: past, present, future.
- Number: singular or plural.
- Person: first, second or third.
- Mood: indicative, subjunctive, or imperative.
- Aspect: Perfective aspect or imperfective aspect (distinguished only in the past tense as remote preterite or imperfect).
- Voice: active or passive.

Finite Catalan verb forms for cantar ("to sing") only 2nd person singular
mood	time		simple	perfect
indicative	present		cantes	has cantat
indicative	past	imperfect	cantaves	havies cantat
indicative	past	remote preterite	cantares	hagueres cantat
indicative	future		cantaràs	hauràs cantat
subjunctive	present		cantis	hagis cantat
subjunctive	past		cantéssis	haguéssis cantat
conditional			cantaries	hauries cantat
imperative			canta	—

Non-finite Catalan verb forms for cantar ("to sing")
	simple	perfect
infinitive	cantar	haver cantat
gerund	cantant	havent cantat
participle	cantat	–

Like all the Romance languages, Catalan verbal inflection is more complex than the nominal. Suffixation is omnipresent, while morphological alternations play a secondary role. Vowel alternances are active, as well as infixation and suppletion. However, these are not as productive as in Spanish, and are mostly restricted to irregular verbs.

The Catalan verbal system is basically common to all Western Romance, except that most dialects replace the analytic perfect indicative with a periphrastic tense composed of vaig, vas (vares), va, vam (vàrem), vau (vàreu), van (varen) and the infinitive.

Catalan verbs are traditionally divided into three conjugations, with vowel themes -a-, -e-, -i-, the last two being split into two subtypes. However, this division is mostly theoretical. Only the first conjugation is nowadays productive (with about 3500 common verbs), while the third (the subtype of servir, with about 700 common verbs) is semiproductive. The verbs of the second conjugation are fewer than 100, and it is not possible to create new ones, except by compounding.

=== Verbal periphrases ===
Verbal periphrases of obligation:

- Caldre + que + infinitive (personal)
- Caldre + infinitive (impersonal)
- Haver + de + infinitive (personal)
- Haver-se + de + infinitive (impersonal)
- Fer falta (impersonal)
- Ser menester + que + verb in subjunctive (personal)
- Ser menester + infinitive (impersonal)
- Ser necessari + que + verb in subjunctive (personal)
- Ser necessari + infinitive (impersonal)

(*) Although it is not correct the usage of the verbal periphrasis *tenir + que + infinitive (obligation) in the Standard (instead of haver + de, which is roughly equivalent to English "have to"), it is widely used in colloquial Catalan and Valencian. The same occurs with *haver-hi + que + infinitive.

Verbal periphrases of probability:

- Deure + infinitive
- Potser / Segurament / Probablement + verb in indicative
- Poder + ser + verb in subjunctive
- Ser probable + que + verb in subjunctive
- Ser possible + que + verb in subjunctive
- Poder + infinitive (it is also a periphrasis of capability)

Verbal periphrases of imminence, intention or future:

- Ara + verb in present or future (immediate action)
- De seguida + verb in present or future (immediate action)
- Tot seguit + verb in present or future (immediate action)
- Verb in present or future (not necessarily immediate action)
- Pensar + infinitive (periphrasis of intention)
- Estar a punt de + infinitive (immediate action)

Other modal and aspectual verbal periphrases:

- Vindre a + infinitive (modal verbal periphrasis of approximation value, with the verb dir, to say, it has a justification aspect)
- Gosar + infinitive (modal verbal periphrasis of audacity)
- Saber + infinitive (modal verbal periphrasis of ingressive value)
- Acabar de + infinitive (modal verbal periphrasis of culminative value)
- Arribar a + infinitive (aspectual periphrasis of culminative and ponderative value)
- Començar a + infinitive (aspectual periphrasis of ingressive value)
- Posar-se a + infinitive (aspectual periphrasis of ingressive value)
- Arrencar (or Arrancar) a + infinitive (aspectual periphrasis of ingressive value)
- Rompre a + infinitive (aspectual periphrasis of ingressive value)
- Voler + infinitive (aspectual periphrasis of ingressive value)
- Soler + infinitive (aspectual periphrasis of habitual value)
- Tornar a + infinitive (aspectual periphrasis of repetitive value)
- Estar + gerund (aspectual periphrasis of progressive value)
- Anar + gerund (aspectual periphrasis of progressive value)
- Continuar + gerund (aspectual periphrasis of durative value)
- Seguir + gerund (aspectual periphrasis of durative value)
- Tindre + past participle (aspectual periphrasis of resultative value)
- Quedar + past participle (aspectual periphrasis of resultative value)
- Deixar + past participle (aspectual periphrasis of resultative value)

== Bibliography ==
- "Gramàtica normativa valenciana" (PDF) (in Valencian). Valencia: Universitat Politècnica de València.
- Fabra, Pompeu (1933) [1918]. Gramàtica Catalana (PDF) (in Catalan) (7th ed.). Barcelona: Institut d'Estudis Catalans. ISBN 84-7283-290-2. [Facsimile published in 1995]
- Ferrater; et al. (1973). "Català". Enciclpèdia Catalana Volum 4 (in Catalan) (1977, corrected ed.). Barcelona: Enciclopèdia Catalana, S.A. pp. 628–639. ISBN 84-85-194-04-7.
- Badia i Margarit, Antoni M. (1995). Gramàtica de la llengua catalana: Descriptiva, normativa, diatòpica, diastràtica (in Catalan). Barcelona: Proa.
- Freysselinard, Eric (2002). Grammaire et vocabulaire du catalan (in French). Paris: Ophrys. ISBN 2-7080-1037-9.
- Swan, Michael (2001). Learner English: A Teacher's Guide to Interference and Other Problems, Volume 1. Cambridge University Press. ISBN 9780521779395.
- Pellicer, Joan E.; Ferran, Francesc (1998). Gramática de uso de la lengua catalana (in Spanish). Barcelona: MIL999. ISBN 84-930236-0-4.
- Yates, Alan (1993). Teach Yourself Catalan. NTC/Contemporary Publishing Company. ISBN 0-8442-3755-8.
- Wheeler, Max; Yates, Alan; Dols, Nicolau (1999). Catalan: A Comprehensive Grammar. New York: Routledge. ISBN 0-415-20777-0.
