= Faroese grammar =

Grammar of the Faroese language

Faroese grammar is typical of a North Germanic language; Faroese is an inflected language with three grammatical genders and four cases: nominative, accusative, dative and genitive.

== Noun inflection ==
Below is a representation of three grammatical genders, two numbers and four cases in the nominal inflection. This is an overview - Faroese has more declensions than are listed here. In modern Faroese, the genitive has a very limited use, and possession is mostly expressed with various prepositional phrases instead. For most native speakers, the genitive is a learned and somewhat stilted form compared to the other cases, which are learned naturally in regular colloquial situations.

Examples:

- hvør, hvat? interrogative pronoun "who, what?"
- ein indefinite article "a"
- stórur adjective "big"
- bátur noun "boat"
- ein stórur bátur – a big boat (m.)
- ein vøkur genta – a beautiful girl (f.)
- eitt gott barn – a good child (n.)

In the plural you will see that the numeral tvey (2) is inflected.

Indefinite phrases
Singular	?	Masculine	?	Feminine	?	Neuter
Nominative	hvør?	ein stórur bátur	hvør?	ein vøkur genta	hvat?	eitt gott barn
Accusative	hvønn?	ein stóran bát	hvørja?	eina vakra gentu	hvat?	eitt gott barn
Dative	hvørjum?	einum stórum báti	hvørj(ar)i?	einari vakari gentu	hvørjum?	einum góðum barni
Genitive	hvørs?	(eins stórs báts)	hvørjar?	(einar vakrar gentu)	hvørs?	(eins góðs barns)
Plural	?	Masculine	?	Feminine	?	Neuter
Nominative	hvørjir?	tveir stórir bátar	hvørjar?	tvær vakrar gentur	hvørji?	tvey góð børn
Accusative	hvørjar?	tveir stórar bátar	hvørjar?	tvær vakrar gentur	hvørji?	tvey góð børn
Dative	hvørjum?	tveimum stórum bátum	hvørjum?	tveimum vøkrum gentum	hvørjum?	tveimum góðum børnum
Genitive	hvørja?	(tveggja stóra báta)	hvørja?	(tveggja vakra genta)	hvørja?	(tveggja góða barna)

If the noun is definite, the adjective inflects weak, and the noun gets a suffix article, as in any Scandinavian language, although Icelandic does not generally need a pre-posed definite article in this construction.

The interrogative pronoun is the same as above. In the plural, the plural form of the definite article is used.

Examples:

- tann stóri báturin – the big boat-the
- tann vakra gentan – the beautiful girl-the
- tað góða barnið – the good child-the

Definite phrases
Singular	Masculine	Feminine	Neuter
Nominative	tann stóri báturin	tann vakra gentan	tað góða barnið
Accusative	tann stóra bátin	ta vøkru gentuna	tað góða barnið
Dative	tí stóra bátinum	tí vøkru gentuni	tí góða barninum
Genitive	(tess stóra bátsins)	(teirrar vøkru gentunnar)	(tess góða barnsins)
Plural	Masculine	Feminine	Neuter
Nominative	teir stóru bátarnir	tær vøkru genturnar	tey góðu børnini
Accusative	teir stóru bátarnar	tær vøkru genturnar	tey góðu børnini
Dative	teimum stóru bátunum	teimum vøkru gentunum	teimum góðu børnunum
Genitive	(teirra stóru bátanna)	(teirra vøkru gentunna)	(teirra góðu barnanna)

=== Personal Pronouns ===
Faroese personal pronouns are:

Personal pronouns
Singular	1.	2.	3. m	3. f	3. n
Nominative	eg	tú	hann	hon	tað
Accusative	meg	teg	hann	hana	tað
Dative	mær	tær	honum	henni	tí
Genitive	mín	tín	hansara	hennara	tess
Plural	1.	2.	3. m	3. f	3. n
Nominative	vit	tit	teir	tær	tey
Accusative	okkum	tykkum	teir	tær	tey
Dative	okkum	tykkum	teimum
Genitive	okkara	tykkara	teirra

Singular

- 1st person: eg [eː] – I, meg [meː] – me (acc.), mær [mɛaɹ] – me (dat.), mín [mʊin] – my
- 2nd person: tú [tʉu] – you, teg [teː] – you (acc.), tær [tɛaɹ] – you (dat.), tín [tʊin] – your (gen.)
- 3rd person masculine: hann [hanː] – he, him (nom., acc.), honum [ˈhoːnʊn] – him (dat.), hansara [ˈhansaɹa] – his (gen.)
- 3rd person feminine: hon [hoːn] – she, hana [ˈhɛana] – her (acc.), henni [hɛnːɪ] – her (dat.), hennara [ˈhɛnːaɹa] – her (gen.)
- 3rd person neuter: tað [tɛa] – it (nom., acc.), tí [tʊi] – it (dat.), tess [tɛsː] – its (gen.)

Plural

- 1st person: vit [viːt] – we, okkum [ɔʰkːʊn] – us (acc., dat.), okkara [ˈɔʰkːaɹa] – our (gen.)
- 2nd person: tit [tiːt] – you (pl.), tykkum [ˈtɪʰkːʊn] – you (acc., dat. pl.) tykkara [ˈtɪʰkːaɹa] – your (gen. pl.)
- 3rd person masculine: teir [taiɹ]~[tɔiɹ] – they, them (m. nom., acc.), teimum [ˈtaimʊn]~[ˈtɔimʊn] – them (dat.), teirra [ˈtaiɹːa]~[ˈtɔiɹːa] – their (gen.)
- 3rd person feminine: tær [tɛaɹ] – they, them (f. nom., acc.)
- 3rd person neuter: tey [tɛi] – they, them (n. nom., acc.)

The 3rd person plural neuter tey is used in all cases when both genders are meant, as in:

- teir eru onglendingar – they [male] are Englishmen
- tær eru føroyingar – they [women] are Faroese
- tey eru fólk úr Evropa – they [neuter] are people from Europe

== Verbs ==
=== Weak Inflection ===
There are 4 classes of weak inflection of verbs (with some underclasses).

Examples:

1. stem-final -a, 2–3.pers.sg. -r – kalla! (imperative), tú/hann kalla-r (you call/he calls)
2. 2–3.pers.sg. -ur – tú/hann sel-ur (you sell/he sells)
3. 2–3.pers.sg. -ir – tú/hann døm-ir (you judge/he judges)
4. 2. pers.sg. -rt – tú rø-rt (you row). In certain surroundings, skerping occurs: eg rógvi [eː ɹɛɡvɪ] (I row) vs. egg róði [eː ɹɔuwɪ] (I rowed).

Weak Inflection
Infinitive	1. kalla		2. selja		3. døma		4. rógva
Singular	Present	Past	Present	Past	Present	Past	Present	Past
1st pers.	kalli	kallaði	selji	seldi	dømi	dømdi	rógvi	róði
2nd pers.	kallar	kallaði	selur	seldi	dømir	dømdi	rørt	róði
3rd pers.	kallar	kallaði	selur	seldi	dømir	dømdi	rør	róði
Plural	Present	Past	Present	Past	Present	Past	Present	Past
1st, 2nd, 3rd pers.	kalla	kallaðu	selja	seldu	døma	dømdu	rógva	róðu
Supine	kallað		selt		dømt		róð

=== Strong Inflection ===
These verbs are also referred to as regular, unlike English and German, the other two Germanic languages, which treat them otherwise. There are 7 classes (with underclasses), distinguished by the variations of the stem-vowel:

1. í – í – ei – i- i; – at bíta – hann bítur – hann beit – teir bitu – teir hava bitið (bite)
2. ó/ú – ý – ey – u- o; – at bróta – hann brýtur – hann breyt – teir brutu – teir hava brotið (break)
3. e/i/ø – i – a – u- o/u; – at svimja – hann svimur – hann svam – teir svumu – teir hava svomið (swim)
4. e/o – e – a – ó – o; – at bera – hann ber – hann bar – teir bóru – teir hava borið (bear)
  - o – e – o – o – o; – at koma – hann kemur – hann kom – teir komu – teir hava komið (come)
5. e/i – e/i – a/á – ó – i; – at liggja – hann liggur – hann lá – teir lógu – teir hava ligið (lie)
6. a – e – ó – ó – a; – at fara – hann fer – hann fór – teir fóru – teir hava farið (go)
7. a/á – æ – e – i – i; – at fáa – hann fær – hann fekk – teir fingu – teir hava fingið (get)

Strong Inflection
Infinitive	1. bíta		2. bróta		3. svimja		4. koma		5. liggja		6. fara		7. fáa
Singular	Present	Past	Present	Past	Present	Past	Present	Past	Present	Past	Present	Past	Present	Past
1st pers.	bíti	beit	bróti	breyt	svimji	svam	komi	kom	liggi	lá	fari	fór	fái	fekk
2nd pers.	bítur	beitst	brýtur	breytst	svimur	svamst	kemur	komst	liggur	lást	fert	fórt	fært	fekst
3rd pers.	bítur	beit	brýtur	breyt	svimur	svam	kemur	kom	liggur	lá	fer	fór	fær	fekk
Plural	Present	Past	Present	Past	Present	Past	Present	Past	Present	Past	Present	Past	Present	Past
1st, 2nd, 3rd pers.	bíta	bitu	bróta	brutu	svimja	svumu	koma	komu	liggja	lógu	fara	fóru	fáa	fingu
Supine	bitið		brotið		svomið		komið		ligið		farið		fingið

=== Auxiliary verbs ===
The auxiliary verbs in Faroese are:

- at vera – to be
- at hava – to have
- at verða – to be, become
- at blíva – to be, become

Auxiliary verbs
Infinitive	1. vera		2. hava		3. verða		4. blíva
Singular	Present	Past	Present	Past	Present	Past	Present	Past
1st pers.	eri	var	havi	hevði	verði	varð	blívi	bleiv
2nd pers.	ert	vart	hevur	hevði	verður	varðst	blívur	bleivst
3rd pers.	er	var	hevur	hevði	verður	varð	blívur	bleiv
Plural	Present	Past	Present	Past	Present	Past	Present	Past
1st, 2nd, 3rd pers.	eru	vóru	hava	høvdu	verða	vórðu	blíva	blivu
Supine	verið		havt		verðið		blivið

Note that vera and verða are homonyms.

=== Preterite-present verbs ===
The preterite-present verbs in Faroese are:

- at kunna – to be able to
- at munna – to want
- at mega – to be allowed to
- at skula – shall
- at vita – to know
- at vilja – to want

Preterite-present verbs
Infinitive	1. kunna		2. munna		3. mega		4. skula		5. vita		6. vilja
Singular	Present	Past	Present	Past	Present	Past	Present	Past	Present	Past	Present	Past
1st pers.	kann	kundi	man	mundi	má	mátti	skal	skuldi	veit	visti	vil	vildi
2nd pers.	kanst	kundi	manst	mundi	mást	mátti	skalt	skuldi	veitst	visti	vilt	vildi
3rd pers.	kann	kundi	man	mundi	má	mátti	skal	skuldi	veit	visti	vil	vildi
Plural	Present	Past	Present	Past	Present	Past	Present	Past	Present	Past	Present	Past
1st, 2nd, 3rd pers.	kunnu/ kunna	kundu	munnu/ munna	mundu	mugu/ mega	máttu	skulu/ skula	skuldu	vita	vistu	vilja	vildu
Supine	kunnað		munnað		megað		skulað		vitað		viljað

== Adjectives ==
Most adjectives inflect for gender, number, case and definitiveness, and for positive, comparative and superlative.

== Adverbs ==
Many adverbs inflect in positive, comparative and superlative.
