= Malay grammar =

Overview of the grammar of the Malay language

Malay grammar is the body of rules that describe the structure of expressions in the Malay language (Brunei, Malaysia, and Singapore) and Indonesian (Indonesia and Timor Leste). This includes the structure of words, phrases, clauses and sentences. In Malay and Indonesian, there are four basic parts of speech: nouns, verbs, adjectives, and grammatical function words (particles). Nouns and verbs may be basic roots, but frequently they are derived from other words by means of prefixes and suffixes.

For clarity, ⟨ê⟩ is used to denote schwa /ə/, while ⟨e⟩ is used to denote /e/, as both Malay and Indonesian in their orthography do not distinguish both phonemes and are written as ⟨e⟩ (Indonesian also uses accentless ⟨e⟩ for /ə/ and ⟨é⟩ for /e/ instead as in Javanese).

== Word formation ==
Malay is an agglutinative language, and new words are formed by three methods. New words can be created by attaching affixes onto a root word (affixation), formation of a compound word (composition), or repetition of words or portions of words (reduplication). However, the Malay morphology has been simplified significantly, resulting on extensive derivational morphology but also having minimal inflectional morphology. Because of this, Malay and Indonesian are together classified as partially isolating languages, like other languages spoken in the mainland Southeast Asia.

=== Affixes ===
Root words are either nouns or verbs, which can be affixed to derive new words, e.g., masak (to cook) yields mêmasak (cooks, as a verb), mêmasakkan (cooks for), dimasak (cooked) as well as pêmasak (a cook), masakan (a meal, cookery). Many initial consonants undergo mutation when prefixes are added: e.g., sapu (sweep) becomes pênyapu (broom); panggil (to call) becomes mêmanggil (calls/calling), tapis (to sift) becomes mênapis (sifts).

Other examples of the use of affixes to change the meaning of a word can be seen with the word ajar (teach):

- ajar = teach
- ajar-an = teachings
- bêl-ajar = to learn, to study (the object is not necessary)
- mêng-ajar = to teach
- di-ajar = being taught (intransitive)
- di-ajar-kan = being taught (transitive)
- mêmpêl-ajar-i = to learn, to study (the object is necessary)
- dipêl-ajar-i = being studied
- pêl-ajar = student
- pêng-ajar = teacher
- pêl-ajar-an = subject, education
- pêng-ajar-an = lesson, moral of story
- pêmbêl-ajar-an = learning
- têr-ajar = taught (accidentally)
- têrpêl-ajar = well-educated, literally "been taught"
- bêrpêl-ajar-an = is educated, literally "has education"

There are four types of affixes, namely prefixes (in Malay: awalan), suffixes (akhiran), circumfixes (apitan) and infixes (sisipan). These affixes are categorised into noun affixes, verb affixes, and adjective affixes.

Noun affixes are affixes that form nouns upon addition to root words. The following are examples of noun affixes:

Type of noun affixes	Affix	Example of root word	Example of derived word
Prefix	pê(r)- ~ pên(g)-	duduk (sit)	pên-duduk (population)
	kê-	hendak (want)	kê-hendak (desire)
	juru-	wang (money)	juru-wang (cashier)
Infix	-⟨êl⟩-	tunjuk (point)	t-êl-unjuk (index finger, command)
	-⟨êm⟩-	kêlut (dishevelled)	k-êm-êlut (chaos, crisis)
	-⟨êr⟩-	gigi (teeth)	g-êr-igi (toothed blade)
Suffix	-an	bangun (wake up, raise)	bangun-an (building)
Circumfix	kê-...-an	raja (king)	kê-raja-an (kingdom)
	pêr-...-an pêng-...-an	kêrja (work)	pê-kêrja-an (occupation)

The prefix pêr- drops its r before r, l and frequently before p, t, k. In some words it is pêng-; though formally distinct in both phonologically and functionally, these are treated as variants of the same prefix in Malay grammar books.

Similarly, verb affixes are attached to root words to form verbs. In Malay, there are:

Type of verb affixes	Affix	Example of root word	Example of derived word
Prefix	bêr-	ajar (teach) (l-deleting)	bêl-ajar (to study)
	mêng-	tolong (help)	mên-(t)olong (to help)
	di-	ambil (take)	di-ambil (be taken)
	mêmpêr-	kêmas (tidy up, orderly)	mêmpêr-kêmas (to arrange further)
	dipêr-	dalam (deep)	dipêr-dalam (be deepened)
	têr-	makan (eat)	têr-makan (to have accidentally eaten)
Suffix	-kan	lêtak (place, keep)	lêtak-kan (put it down)
	-i	jauh (far)	jauh-i (avoid)
Circumfix	bêr-...-an	pasang (pair)	bêr-pasang-an (in pairs)
	bêr-...-kan	dasar (base)	bêr-dasar-kan (based on)
	mêng-...-kan	pasti (sure)	mêm-(p)asti-kan (to make sure)
	mêng-...-i	têman (company)	mên-(t)êman-i (to accompany)
	mêmpêr-...-kan	guna (use)	mêmpêr-guna-kan (to utilise, to exploit)
	mêmpêr-...-i	ajar (teach)	mêmpêl-ajar-i (to study)
	kê-...-an	hilang (disappear)	ke-hilang-an (to lose)
	di-...-i	sakit (pain)	di-sakit-i (to be hurt by)
	di-...-kan	benar (right)	di-bênar-kan (is allowed to)
	dipêr-...-kan	kênal (know, recognise)	diper-kênal-kan (is being introduced)

Adjective affixes are attached to root words to form adjectives:

Type of adjective affixes	Affix	Example of root word	Example of derived word
Prefix	têr-	kênal (know)	têr-kênal (famous)
	sê-	lari (run)	sê-lari (parallel)
Infix	-⟨êl⟩-	serak (disperse)	s-êl-erak (messy)
	-⟨êm⟩-	cêrlang (radiant bright)	c-êm-êrlang (bright, excellent)
	-⟨êr⟩-	sabut (husk)	s-êr-abut (dishevelled)
Circumfix	kê-...-an	barat (west)	kê-barat-an (westernized)

In addition to these affixes, Malay also has a lot of borrowed affixes from other languages such as Sanskrit, Arabic and English. For example, maha-, pasca-, eka-, bi-, anti-, pro- etc.

=== Reduplication ===
Reduplication (kata ganda or kata ulang) in the Malay language is a very productive process. It is mainly used for forming plurals, but sometimes it may alter the meaning of the whole word, or change the usage of the word in sentences.

==== Forms ====
There are four types of words reduplication in Malay, namely

- Full reduplication (kata ganda penuh (Malaysian) or kata ulang utuh (Indonesian) or dwilingga)
- Partial reduplication (kata ganda separa (Malaysian) or kata ulang sebagian (Indonesian) or dwipurwa)
- Rhythmic reduplication (kata ganda berentak (Malaysian) or kata ulang salin suara (Indonesian))
- Free-form reduplication

Full reduplication is the complete duplication of the word, separated by a dash (-). For example, buku (book) when duplicated form buku-buku (books), while the duplicated form of batu (stone) is batu-batu (stones).

Partial reduplication repeats only the initial consonant of the word, such as dêdaunan (leaves) from the word daun (leaf), and têtangga (neighbor) from the word tangga (ladder). The words are usually not separated by spaces or punctuation, and each is considered a single word.

Rhythmic reduplication repeats the whole word, but one or more of its phonemes are altered. For example, the word gêrak (motion) can be reduplicated rhythmically to form gêrak-gêrik (movements) by altering the vowel. The reduplication can also be formed by altering the consonant, e.g., in sayur-mayur (vegetables [bundled for the market]) from the root word sayur (vegetable/vegetables [what is found on plate]).

Free-form reduplication indicates multiplicity but does not follow any identified pattern of formation. This includes the words ipar-duai (brothers and sisters-in-law) and ulang-alik (back and forth), which are formed by components that may have a suprasegmental relationship.

== Nouns ==
Common derivational affixes for nouns are pêng-/pêr-/juru- (actor, instrument, or someone characterized by the root), -an (collectivity, similarity, object, place, instrument), kê-...-an (abstractions and qualities, collectivities), pêr-/pêng-...-an (abstraction, place, goal or result).

=== Gender ===
Malay does not make use of grammatical gender. There are only a few words that use natural gender; the same word used for he and she is also used for his and her. Most of the words that refer to people (family terms, professions, etc.) have a form that does not distinguish between the genders. For example, adik can refer to a younger sibling of any gender. To specify the natural gender of a noun, an adjective must be added: adik lêlaki/adik laki-laki corresponds to "brother" but really means "male younger sibling". There are some words that are gendered. For instance, putêri means "princess" and putêra means "prince"; words like these are usually borrowed from other languages (in this case, Sanskrit).

=== Number ===
There is no grammatical plural in Malay. Thus orang may mean either "person" or "people". Plurality is expressed by the context, or the usage of words such as numerals, bêbêrapa "some", or sêmua "all" that express plurality. In many cases, it simply isn't relevant to the speaker. Because of this, both Malay and Indonesian effectively has general number, similar to many languages of East Asia and Southeast Asia.

Reduplication is commonly used to emphasize plurality. However, reduplication has many other functions. For example, orang-orang means "(all the) people", but orang-orangan means "scarecrow". Similarly, while hati means "heart" or "liver", hati-hati is a verb meaning "to be careful". Also, not all reduplicated words are inherently plural, such as orang-orangan "scarecrow/scarecrows", biri-biri "a/some sheep" and kupu-kupu "butterfly/butterflies", these are all words in their own rights and have nothing to do with plurality, as is the case with some animal names such as "kura-kura" for tortoise and "laba(h)-laba(h)" for spider. Some reduplication is rhyming rather than exact, as in sayur-mayur "(all sorts of) vegetables".

Distributive affixes derive mass nouns that are effectively plural: pohon "tree", pêpohonan "flora, trees"; rumah "house", pêrumahan "housing, houses"; gunung "mountain", pê(r)gunungan "mountain range, mountains".

Quantity words come before the noun: sêribu orang "a thousand people", bêbêrapa pê(r)gunungan "a series of mountain ranges", bêbêrapa kupu-kupu "some butterflies".

== Pronouns ==
Personal pronouns are not a separate part of speech, but a subset of nouns. They are frequently omitted, and there are numerous ways to say "you". Commonly the person's name, title, title with name, or occupation is used ("does Johnny want to go?", "would Madam like to go?"); kin terms, including fictive kinship, are extremely common. However, there are also dedicated personal pronouns, as well as the demonstrative pronouns ini "this, the" and itu "that, the".

=== Personal pronouns ===
From the perspective of a European language, Malay boasts a wide range of different pronouns, especially to refer to the addressee (the so-called second person pronouns). These are used to differentiate several parameters of the person they are referred to, such as the social rank and the relationship between the addressee and the speaker.

This table shows an overview over the most commonly and widely used pronouns of the Malay language:

Common pronouns
person	clusivity	respect	singular	plural
1st person	exclusive	informal, familiar	aku	kami (we: they and I, s/he and I)
1st person	exclusive	standard, polite	saya	kami (we: they and I, s/he and I)
1st person	inclusive			kita (we/us: you and I, we and you)
2nd person		familiar	kamu	kalian
2nd person		polite	A/anda (Note: The spelling Anda with an uppercase a is used in Indonesia, in addition with spellings with a lowercase a, due to the influence of archaic Dutch Uw.) (you)	A/anda (sekalian/semua) (you, y'all)
3rd person		colloquial	dia ~ ia (s/he ~ it)	dia orang (they)
3rd person		formal standard	dia ~ ia (s/he ~ it)	mêreka (they)

==== First person pronouns ====
Notable among the personal-pronoun system is a distinction between two forms of "we": kita (you and me, you and us) and kami (us, but not you). The distinction is increasingly confused in colloquial Indonesian, but not in Malay.

Saya and aku are the two major forms of "I"; saya (or its literally/archaic form sahaya) is used when speaking to some family members, elders, new acquaintances, and when speaking in a formal setting, whereas aku is used informally or casually (e.g. with friends). Depending on how important the usage of the appropriate pronoun is to both speakers, aku can be used when speaking to new acquaintances without being interpreted as disrespectful.

Sa(ha)ya may also be used for "we", but in such cases it is usually used with sêkalian or sêmua "all"; this form is ambiguous as to whether it corresponds with exclusive kami or inclusive kita. Less common are hamba "slave", hamba tuan, hamba datok (all extremely humble), beta (a royal addressing oneselves), patik (a commoner addressing a royal), kami (royal or editorial "we"), kita, têman, and kawan (lit. "friend").

==== Second person pronouns ====
There are three common forms of "you", anda (polite), kamu (familiar), and kalian "y'all" (commonly used as a plural form of you, slightly informal). Anda is used in formal contexts like in advertisements and business or to show respect (though terms like tuan "sir" and other titles also work the same way), while kamu is used in informal situations. Anda sêkalian or Anda semua are polite plural. Êngkau orang —contracted to kau orang or korang—is used to address subjects plural in the most informal context.

Êngkau (commonly shortened to kau) and hang (dialectical) are used to social inferiors or equals, awak to equals, and êncik (contracted to cik before a name) is polite, traditionally used for people without title. The compounds makcik and pakcik are used with village elders one is well acquainted with or the guest of.

Tuanku (from tuan aku, "my lord") is used by commoners to address royal members.

==== Third person pronouns ====
The common word for "s/he" is ia, which has the object and emphatic/focused form dia; consequently ia has been recently used to refer to animals. Bêliau ("his/her Honour") is respectful. As with the English "you", names and kin terms are extremely common. Colloquially, dia orang (or its contracted form diorang) is commonly used for the plural "they" whereas mereka "they", mereka itu, or orang itu "those people" are used in writing.

Baginda – corresponding to "his/her Majesty/Highness" – is used for addressing royal figures and religious prophets, especially in Islamic literature.

==== Regional varieties ====
There are a large number of other words for "I" and "you", many regional, dialectical, or borrowed from local languages. Saudara (masc., "you") or saudari (fem., pl. saudara-saudara / saudari-saudari / saudara-saudari) show utmost respect. Daku ("I") and dikau ("you") are poetic or romantic. Indonesian gua ("I") and lu "you" (both from Hokkien) are slang and extremely informal. In the dialect of the northern states of Malaysia – Kedah, Penang, Perlis and Perak (northern) typically hang is used as "you" (singular), while hampa or hangpa are used for the plural "you". In the state of Pahang, two variants for "I" and "you" exist, depending on location: in East Pahang, around Pekan, kome is used as "I" while in the west around Temerloh, koi, keh or kah is used. Kome is also used in Kuala Kangsar, Perak, but instead it means "you". This allegedly originated from the fact that both the royal families of Pahang and Perak (whose seats are in Pekan and Kuala Kangsar respectively) were descendants of the same ancient line.

The informal pronouns aku, kamu, engkau, ia, kami, and kita are indigenous to Malay.

=== Possessive pronouns ===
Aku, kamu, êngkau, and ia have short possessive enclitic forms. All others retain their full forms like other nouns, as does emphatic dia: meja saya, meja kita, meja anda, meja dia "my table, our table, your table, his/her table".

Possessed forms of meja "table"
Pronoun	Enclitic	Possessed form
aku	-ku	mejaku (my table)
kamu	-mu	mejamu (your table)
engkau	-kau	mejakau (your table)
ia	-nya	mejanya (his, her, their table)

There are also proclitic forms of aku and êngkau, ku- and kau-. These are used when there is no emphasis on the pronoun:

Ku-dengar raja itu punya pênyakit sopak. Aku tahu ilmu tabib. Aku-lah mêngobati dia.
"It has come to my attention that the king has a skin disease. I am skilled in medicine. I will cure him."

Here ku-verb is used for a general report, aku verb is used for a factual statement, and emphatic aku-lah mêng-verb (≈ "I am the one who...") for focus on the pronoun.

=== Demonstrative pronouns ===
There are two demonstrative pronouns in Malay. Ini "this, these" is used for a noun generally near to the speaker. Itu "that, those" is used for a noun generally far from the speaker. Either may sometimes be equivalent to English "the". There is no difference between singular and plural. However, plural can be indicated through duplication of a noun followed by a ini or itu. The word yang "which" is often placed before demonstrative pronouns to give emphasis and a sense of certainty, particularly when making references or enquiries about something/someone, like English "this one" or "that one".

Pronoun	Malay	English
ini	buku ini	This book, these books, the book(s)
ini	buku-buku ini	These books, (all) the books
itu	kucing itu	That cat, those cats, the cat(s)
itu	kucing-kucing itu	Those cats, the (various) cats

Pronoun + yang	Example Sentence	English Meaning
Yang ini	Q: Anda ma(h)u mêmbêli buku yang mana? A: Saya ma(h)u beli yang ini	Q: Which book do you wish to purchase? A: I would like this one
Yang itu	Q: Kucing mana yang makan tikusmu? A: Yang itu!	Q: Which cat ate your mouse? A: That one!

== Measure words ==
Another distinguishing feature of Malay is its use of measure words, also called classifiers (penjodoh bilangan). In this way, it is similar to many other languages of Asia, including Chinese, Japanese, Vietnamese, Thai, Burmese, and Bengali.

Measure words are found in English, such as two grains of sand or a loaf of bread where *two sands and *a bread would be ungrammatical. The word satu reduces to sê-, as it does in other compounds:

measure word	used for measuring	literal translation	example
buah	things (in general), large things, abstract nouns, houses, cars, ships, mountains; books, rivers, chairs, some fruits, thoughts, etc.	'fruit'	dua buah meja (two tables), lima buah rumah (five houses)
ekor	animals	'tail'	sêekor ayam (a chicken), tiga ekor kambing (three goats)
orang	human beings	'person'	sêorang lelaki (a man), ênam orang pêtani (six farmers), sêratus orang murid (a hundred students)
biji	smaller rounded objects, most fruits, cups, nuts	'grain'	sêbiji/ sêbutir têlur (an egg), sêbiji apel (an apple), sêbutir/ butiran-butiran bêras (rice or rices)
batang	long stiff things, trees, walking sticks, pencils	'trunk, rod'	sêbatang pensil (a pencil), sêbatang kayu (a stick)
hêlai, lai	things in thin layers or sheets, paper, cloth, feathers, hair	'leaf'	sêpuluh hêlai pakaian (ten cloths)
kêping	flat fragments, slabs of stone, pieces of wood, pieces of bread, land, coins, paper	'chip'	sêkêping kertas (a piece of paper)
pasang	items in pairs	'pair'	sêpasang sêpatu (a pair of shoes), sêpasang kêkasih (a pair of lovers)
pucuk	letters, firearms, needles	'sprout'	sêpucuk surat (a letter)
bilah	blades: knives, spears	'lathe'	sêbilah pisau (a knife)

Less common are

bêntuk	rings, hooks (with ringed 'eyes')	'shape'	
bidanɡ	mats, widths of cloth	'breadth'	
bongkah	solid chunks or pieces, typically of natural materials or heavy items like rocks, logs, ice blocks, or clay.	'chunk'	
butir	smallest rounded objects smaller fruits, seeds, grains, rounds of ammunition, gems, points	'particle'	commonly replaced with biji
carik	things easily torn, like paper	'shred'	
ikat	bundles of items that are tied together like sticks, firewood, vegetables or flowers	'tie'	
kaki	long-stemmed flowers	'leg'	
kêrat		'fragment'	
kuntum	flowers	'blossom'	
papan	bitter bean (petai)	'board'	
patah	words, proverbs	'fragment'	
pintu	houses in a row	'door'	
potong	slices of bread etc.	'cut'	
puntung	stumps, stubs, butt ends of firewood, cigarettes, teeth	stump	
tangga	traditional houses with ladders	'ladder'	
tangkai	flowers	'stem'	
urat	threads, sinew	'fiber, vein'	
utas	nets, cords, ribbons	'cord'	

Measure words are not necessary just to say "a": burung "a bird, birds". Using sê- plus a measure word is closer to English "one" or "a certain":

Ada sêekor burung yang pandai bêrcakap
"There was a (certain) bird that could talk"

== Verbs ==
Verbs are not inflected for person or number, and they are not marked for tense; tense is instead denoted by time adverbs (such as "yesterday") or by other tense indicators, such as sudah "already" and belum "not yet". On the other hand, there is a complex system of verb affixes to render nuances of meaning and to denote voice or intentional and accidental moods, and it has many exceptions for its derivation. Some of these affixes are obsolete in colloquial speech.

Examples of these include the prefixes:

- mêng- (agent focus, frequently but erroneously called "active voice", for AVO word order);
- di- (patient focus, frequently but erroneously called "passive voice", for OVA word order);
- pêr- (causative, also notice that when mixed with mêng- prefix forms mêmper- instead of mêmêr-, latter informally);
- bêr- (stative or habitual; intransitive VS order); and
- têr- (involitive actions, such as those that are involuntary, sudden, or accidental, for VA = VO order).

The suffixes include:

- -kan (causative or benefactive); and
- -i (locative, repetitive, or exhaustive).

The circumfixes include:

- bêr-...-an (plural subject, reciprocity);
- bêr-…-kan (instrumental); and
- kê-...-an (unintentional or potential action or state).

A special case of one prefix combined with reduplication include:

- …-mêng-… (reciprocity).

The prefix mêng- (and pêng-) changes depending to the first consonant of the root. The variant mêngê- is used before monosyllabic roots.

The prefixes bêr- and têr- change to bê- and tê- when preceding initial r-, or preceding the first syllable which contains -êr- (ber- -an + pergi "to go" → bêpêrgian). The prefixes ber- and pêr- (but not ter-) preserve an irregular -l- when prefixed to the word ajar "to teach".

Prefix	Initial consonant	Examples (with consonants kept)	Examples (with consonants lenited)
mêng-	(vowels) g h k	gulung → mênggulung hantar → mênghantar ajar → mêngajar isi → mêngisi	kênal → mêngênal
mêm-	b p f	bêli → mêmbêli	pilih → mêmilih
mên-	c d j sy t z	cabut → mêncabut dukung → mêndukung jawab → mênjawab	tulis → mênulis
mê-	l m n ny ng r w y	layang → mêlayang masak → mêmasak nanti → mênanti rampas → mêrampas	-
mêny-	s	-	surat → mênyurat
mêngê-	-	bom → mêngêbom	-

Here is the example of derived forms of duduk:

- duduk "to sit down"
- mêndudukkan "to sit someone down, give someone a seat, to appoint"
- mênduduki "to sit on, to occupy"
- didudukkan "to be given a seat, to be appointed"
- diduduki "to be sat on, to be occupied"
- têrduduk "to sink down, to come to sit"
- kêdudukan "to be situated", "position"
- bêrsekedudukan "to cohabit"
- bêrkedudukan "to have position"
- pênduduk "resident"

Often the derivation changes the meaning of the verb rather substantially:

- tinggal "to reside, to live (in a place)"
- meninggali "to reside, to live (in a place)"
- bertinggal "to leave a message"
- mêninggal to die, to pass away (short form of meninggal dunia, "to pass on from the world")
- mêninggalkan "to leave (a place)", "to leave behind/abandon" (someone/something)
- ditinggalkan "to be left behind, to be abandoned"
- têrtinggal "to be left behind"
- kêtinggalan "to miss (a bus, train)" (and thus "to be left behind")
- pêninggalan "heritage"
- tinggalan "remnant"

Forms in têr- and kê-...-an are often equivalent to adjectives in English. In some verbs which derives from adjectives, like mêmanjang "to lengthen"; when affixed with ter- (têrpanjang "longest") coincides with the superlative prefix ter-, effectively has the meaning "longest" instead of "(accidentally) lengthened", the meaning is served by reaffixed forms like têrpanjangi or têrpanjangkan.

=== Negation ===
Four words are used for negation in Malay, namely tidak, bukan, jangan, and belum.

- Tidak (not) negates verbs and adjectives.
- Bukan (be-not) is used in the negation of a noun.

For example:

Malay	Gloss	English
Saya tidak tahu	I not know	I do not know
Ibu saya tidak sênang	mother I not be-happy	My mother is not happy
Itu bukan anjing saya	that be-not dog I	That is not my dog

- Jangan (do not!) is used for negating imperatives or advising against certain actions. For example,

Jangan tinggalkan saya di sini!
Don't leave me here!

- Bêlum is used with the sense that something has not yet been accomplished or experienced. In this sense, bêlum can be used as a negative response to a question.

Anda sudah pêrnah ke Indonesia, or Anda sudah pêrnah ke Indonesia bêlum?
Have you ever been to Indonesia before, (or not)?

Bêlum, saya masih bêlum pernah pergi ke Indonesia
No, I have not yet been to Indonesia

Orang itu bêlum têrbiasa tinggal di Indonesia
That person is not used yet to living in Indonesia.

=== Function words ===
16 types of function words in Malay perform a grammatical function in a sentence. Amongst these are conjunctions, interjections, prepositions, negations and determiners.

== Adjectives ==
There are grammatical adjectives in Malay. Stative verbs are often used for the purpose as well. Adjectives are always placed after the noun that they modify. Hence, "rumah saya" means "my house", while "saya rumah" means "I am a house".

Malay	Gloss (literal translation)	English	Remarks
Hutannya hijau	forest its green	The forest is green	as in French la forêt verte
Kêreta yang merah	train/car which red	The red train/car	
Buku têrbêsar yang aku punya	book biggest which I have	The biggest book that i have	
Orang paling tampan yang aku têmui	person most handsome that I meet	The most handsome person I met	

To form superlatives, the prefix têr- is used, although alternatively there are some adverbs forming periphrastic superlatives like paling "the most".

== Word order ==
Stative verbs, demonstrative determiners, and possessive determiners follow the noun they modify.

Malay does not have a grammatical subject in the sense that English does (traditional grammars, however, have a concept of grammatical subjects). In intransitive clauses, the noun comes before the verb. When there is both an agent and an object, these are separated by the verb (OVA or AVO), with the difference encoded in the voice of the verb. OVA, commonly but inaccurately called "passive", is the basic and most common word order.

Either the agent or object or both may be omitted. This is commonly done to accomplish one of two things:

1) Adding a sense of politeness and respect to a statement or question

For example, a polite shop assistant in a store may avoid the use of pronouns altogether and ask:

Ellipses of pronoun (agent & object)	Literal English	Idiomatic English
Boleh/bisa dibantu?	Can + to be helped?	Can (I) help (you)?

2) Agent or object is unknown, not important, or understood from context

For example, a friend may enquire as to when you bought your property, to which you may respond:

Ellipses of pronoun (understood agent)	Literal English	Idiomatic English
Rumah ini dibêli lima tahun yang lalu	House this + be purchased five year(s) ago	The house 'was purchased' five years ago

Ultimately, the choice of voice and therefore word order is a choice between actor and patient and depends quite heavily on the language style and context.

=== Emphasis ===
Word order is frequently modified for focus or emphasis, with the focused word usually placed at the beginning of the clause and followed by a slight pause (a break in intonation):

- Saya pêrgi kê pasar kê(l)marin "I went to the market yesterday" – neutral, or with focus on the subject.
- Kê(l)marin saya pêrgi kê pasar "Yesterday I went to the market" – emphasis on yesterday.
- Kê pasar saya pêrgi, kê(l)marin "To the market I went yesterday" – emphasis on where I went yesterday.
- Pêrgi kê pasar, saya, kê(l)marin "To the market went I yesterday" – emphasis on the process of going to the market.

The last two occur more often in speech than writing.

== Bibliography ==
- Ajamiseba, Daniel C. (1983). A Classical Malay Text Grammar: Insights Into a Non-Western Text Tradition. Department of Linguistics, Research School of Pacific Studies, Australian National University. doi:10.15144/PL-D56. ISBN 9780858832862. LCCN 84227458. OL 2978075M.
- Shellabear, W. G. (1912). A Practical Malay Grammar (3rd ed.). Singapore: Methodist Publishing House. ISBN 9781521503935. OCLC 249163041. OL 7112081M.
- Sneddon, James Neil; Adelaar, K. Alexander; Djenar, Dwi N.; Ewing, Michael (2010). Indonesian: A Comprehensive Grammar (2nd ed.). New York: Routledge. ISBN 978-1-135-87351-6. OCLC 1182859658.
- Winstedt, R. O. (1913). Malay Grammar. Oxford: The Clarendon Press. LCCN 18010011. OCLC 5256023. OL 340927W.
