= French articles and determiners =

In French, articles and determiners are required on almost every common noun, much more so than in English. They are inflected to agree in gender (masculine or feminine) and number (singular or plural) with the noun they determine, though most have only one plural form (for masculine and feminine). Many also often change pronunciation when the word that follows them begins with a vowel sound.

While articles are actually a subclass of determiners (and in traditional grammars most French determiners are in turn a subclass of adjectives), they are generally treated separately; thus, they are treated separately here as well.

== Articles ==
French has three articles: a definite article, corresponding in many cases to English the; an indefinite article, corresponding to English a/an; and a partitive article, used roughly like some in English.

=== Definite article ===
The French definite article derives from a Latin distal demonstrative, ille. It evolved from the Old French article system, which shared resemblance to modern English and acquired the marking of generic nouns. This practise was common by the 17th century, although it has been argued that this became widely used as early as in the 13th century.

In French, the definite article is analogous to the English definite article the, although they are sometimes omitted in English. The French definite article can vary according to the gender (feminine or masculine) and number (singular or plural) of the noun. The definite article takes the following forms:

| | singular | | plural |
| | before consonant | before vowel or h muet (Note: mute h) (Note: See Elision (French)) | plural |
|---|---|---|---|
| masculine | le | l' | les |
| feminine | la | l' | les |

The prepositions à ('to, at') and de ('of, from') form contracted forms with the masculine and plural articles le and les: au, du, aux, and des, respectively.

Like the, the French definite article is used with a noun referring to a specific item when both the speaker and the audience know what the item is. It is necessary in the following cases:

| Use | Example |
|---|---|
| General categories and abstractions | La patience est une vertu. Patience is a virtue. |
| Name and adjective clusters | Le vieux Londres est fascinant. Old London is fascinating. |
| Languages (Note: The article can be exempt in several cases when using the passive voice: « Ce livre est écrit en français ».) and academic subjects | Je comprends l'allemand. I understand German. |
| Countries (Note: As opposed to English, there is only a dozen of exceptional country names that do not use articles, of which many of them are island countries.) | Je veux visiter la France. I want to visit France. |
| Seasons | Le printemps est ma saison favorite. Spring is my favourite season. |
| Titles, family names | Voici les Moreau. Here are the Moreaus. |
| Parts of the body | Il se lave les mains. He washes his hands. |
| Days (Note: The singular definite article (le) before the name of a day expresses "on" or "every" (on Monday(s), every Tuesday, etc.)) | Je sors le vendredi soir. I go out every Friday night. |

Unlike the, the French definite article is also used with mass nouns and plural nouns with generic interpretation, and with abstract nouns. For example:

- « J'aime le lait. » ("I like milk.")
- « J'aime les romans. » ("I like novels.")
- « Le capitalisme a transformé ce pays. » ("Capitalism has transformed this country.")

=== Indefinite article ===
The French indefinite article is analogous to the English indefinite article a/an. Like a/an, the French indefinite article is used with a noun referring to a non-specific item, or to a specific item when the speaker and audience do not both know what the item is; so, « J'ai cassé une chaise rouge » ("I broke a red chair"). Unlike a/an, the French indefinite article has a plural form, often translated as some but usually simply omitted in English; so, « Il y a des livres là-bas » ("There are some books over there" or "There are books over there").

The indefinite article takes the following forms:

| | singular | plural |
|---|---|---|
| masculine | un | des |
| feminine | une | des |

1. The indefinite article becomes de (or d' if before a vowel) after a negative verb other than être: « Je n'ai pas de livre » ("I do not have a or any book"). This use is related to expressions of quantity; see below.
2. The plural form des is normally reduced to de (or d' if before a vowel) when it applies to a noun preceded by an adjective: « de nombreux livres » (many books), « d'autres livres » (other books), but « des livres reliés » (bound books).
3. Unlike in English the article is dropped when specifying someone's occupation: « Ma sœur est avocate. » ("My sister is a lawyer").

=== Partitive article ===
The French partitive article is often translated as some, but often simply omitted in English. It is used to indicate an indefinite portion of something uncountable, or an indefinite number of something countable: « J'ai du café » ("I have some coffee" or simply "I have coffee").

The partitive article takes the following forms:

| | singular | | plural |
| | before consonant | before vowel or mute h | plural |
|---|---|---|---|
| masculine | du | de l' | des |
| feminine | de la | de l' | des |

1. Like the indefinite article, the partitive article becomes de (or d' if before a vowel) after a negative verb other than être and before a plural noun preceded by an adjective: « Il ne prend pas d'eau » ("He doesn't take any water" or simply "He doesn't take water").

Notice that, except after a negative verb, the partitive article is formed by combining the preposition de ('of', 'from') with the definite article. Also note that in the plural, and after a negative verb, the indefinite and partitive articles take the same form; this makes sense, as there is no clear difference in meaning in these cases. (Some grammarians actually classify des as either exclusively indefinite or exclusively partitive, and say that the other article has no plural form. This does not affect the interpreted meaning of des.)

== Determiners ==
Determiners, like other adjectives, agree in gender and number with the noun they modify (or, in this case, determine).

=== Possessive determiners ===
The possessive determiners (also called possessive adjectives or, misleadingly, possessive pronouns; analogous to English my, their, etc.) are used to indicate the possessor of the noun they determine. They lexically mark the person and number of the possessor, and are inflected to agree with their noun in gender and number. While English distinguishes between masculine and feminine singular possessors (his vs. her), French does not. As in English, possessive determiners do not necessarily express true possession in the sense of ownership.

Their forms are as follows:

| | | | possessed | |
| | | | singular | plural |
|---|---|---|---|---|
| possessor | first person | singular | mon, ma (Note: The forms mon, ton, and son are used with masculine nouns, or before feminine nouns that begin with either a vowel or a mute h; the forms ma, ta, and sa are used before consonants with feminine nouns.) | mes |
| possessor | first person | plural | notre | nos |
| possessor | second person | singular | ton, ta | tes |
| possessor | second person | plural | votre | vos |
| possessor | third person | singular | son, sa | ses |
| possessor | third person | plural | leur | leurs |

=== Demonstrative determiners ===
| | singular | plural |
|---|---|---|
| masculine | ce cet (before vowel and mute h) | ces |
| feminine | cette | ces |

The demonstrative determiners (or demonstrative adjectives) can mean either this or that, these or those. To be more precise or to avoid ambiguity, -ci or -là can be inserted after the noun:

- cet homme-ci "this man"
- cet homme-là "that man"

There are grammatical rules to determine when one would use c'est or il est. For example, c'est is followed by a noun that may or may not be modified by an adjective, while il est can only be used with an adjective that describes the specific noun. Example:

- Des bals sont tenus pour la charité et certains pour la tenue habillée, mais quand ils sont tenus pour le plaisir, ce sont les bals que je préfère Some balls are held for charity and some for fancy dress, but when they're held for pleasure, they're the balls that I like best

Because tenus is a past participle used as an adjective, ils sont is used; but since bals is a noun, ce sont is used.

=== Interrogative determiners ===
The interrogative determiner quel means which or what. It agrees in gender and number with the noun it modifies:

| | singular | plural |
|---|---|---|
| masculine | quel | quels |
| feminine | quelle | quelles |

Examples: quel train, quelle chaise, quels hommes, and quelles classes.

Quel can be used as an exclamation.

- « Quel film ! » (What a movie!)
- « Quelle gentillesse ! » (What kindness!)

=== Quantifiers ===
A quantifier is a determiner that quantifies its noun, like English "some" and "many". In French, as in English, quantifiers constitute an open word class, unlike most other kinds of determiners. In French, most quantifiers are formed using a noun or adverb of quantity and the preposition de (d' when before a vowel).

Quantifiers formed with a noun of quantity and the preposition de include the following:

- des tas de ("lots of", lit: "piles of")
- trois kilogrammes de ("three kilograms of")
- une bouchée de ("a mouthful of")
- une douzaine de ("a dozen (of)")

Quantifiers formed with an adverb of quantity and the preposition de include the following:

- beaucoup de ("a lot of")
- un peu de ("a little," "a few")
- peu de ("little," "few")
- assez de, suffisamment de ("enough of")
- pas de ("no," "not any")

Other quantifiers include:

- bien + the partitive article ("much" or "many")
- quelque(s) ("some")
- the cardinal numbers ("1, 2, 3...")

== Sources ==
- Epstein, Richard (1995). "The Later Stages in the Development of the Definite Article: Evidence from French". In Andersen, Henning (ed.). Historical Linguistics, 1993. Amsterdam: John Benjamins Publishing Co. pp. 159–175. ISBN 1-55619-578-8. ISSN 0304-0763.
- Ayres-Bennett, Wendy (1971). A history of the French language through texts. London: Routledge. ISBN 0-07-147513-3.
- L'Huillier, Monique (1999). Advanced French Grammar. London: Oxford University Press. ISBN 0-521-48425-1.
- Kurbegov, Eliane (2007). French Grammar Drills. McGraw-Hill Contemporary. ISBN 978-0-07-147513-6.
