= Pronoun =

Word that substitutes for a noun or noun phrase

In linguistics and grammar, a pronoun (glossed pro) is a word or a group of words that one may substitute for a noun or noun phrase.

Pronouns have traditionally been regarded as one of the parts of speech, but some modern theorists would not consider them to form a single class, in view of the variety of functions they perform cross-linguistically. An example of a pronoun is "you", which can be either singular or plural. Sub-types include personal and possessive pronouns, reflexive and reciprocal pronouns, demonstrative pronouns, relative and interrogative pronouns, and indefinite pronouns.

The use of pronouns often involves anaphora, where the meaning of the pronoun is dependent on an antecedent. For example, in the sentence That poor man looks as if he needs a new coat, the meaning of the pronoun he is dependent on its antecedent, that poor man.

The adjective form of the word "pronoun" is "pronominal". (Note: Not to be confused with prenominal, which means "before the noun". For example, English adjectives are prenominal, e.g. the blue house, while there are rare postnominal exceptions like attorneys general.) A pronominal is also a word or phrase that acts as a pronoun. For example, in That's not the one I wanted, the phrase the one (containing the prop-word one) is a pronominal.

== Theory ==
=== Pronoun versus pro-form ===
Pronoun is a category of words. A pro-form is a type of function word or expression that stands in for (expresses the same content as) another word, phrase, clause or sentence where the meaning is recoverable from the context. In English, pronouns mostly function as pro-forms, but there are pronouns that are not pro-forms and pro-forms that are not pronouns.

Pronouns versus Pro-forms
	Example	Pronoun	Pro-form
1	It is a good idea.	✓	✓
2	I know the people who work there.	✓	✓
3	Who works there?	✓	
4	It is raining.	✓	
5	I asked her to help, and she did so right away.		✓
6	JJ and Petra helped, but the others didn't.		✓

Examples [1 & 2] are pronouns and pro-forms. In [1], the pronoun it "stands in" for whatever was mentioned and is a good idea. In [2], the relative pronoun who stands in for "the people".

Examples [3 & 4] are pronouns but not pro-forms. In [3], the interrogative pronoun who does not stand in for anything. Similarly, in [4], it is a dummy pronoun, one that does not stand in for anything. No other word can function there with the same meaning; we do not say "the sky is raining" or "the weather is raining".

A prop-word is a word with little or no semantic content used where grammar dictates a certain sentence member, e.g., to provide a "support" on which to hang a modifier. The word most commonly considered as a prop-word in English is one (with the plural form ones). The prop-word one takes the place of a countable noun in a noun phrase (or determiner phrase), normally in a context where it is clear which noun it is replacing. For example, in a context in which hats are being talked about, the red one means "the red hat", and the ones we bought means "the hats we bought". The prop-word thus functions somewhat similarly to a pronoun, except that a pronoun usually takes the place of a whole noun (determiner) phrase (for example, "the red hat" may be replaced by the pronoun "it".)

Finally, in [5 & 6], there are pro-forms that are not pronouns. In [5], did so is a verb phrase that stands in for "helped" (a pro-verb), inflected from to help stated earlier in the sentence. Similarly, in [6], others is a common noun, not a pronoun, but the others probably stands in for the names of other people involved (e.g., Sho, Alana, and Ali), all proper nouns.

=== Grammar ===
Pronouns (antōnymía) are listed as one of eight parts of speech in The Art of Grammar, a treatise on Greek grammar attributed to Dionysius Thrax and dating from the 2nd century BC. The pronoun is described there as "a part of speech substitutable for a noun and marked for a person." Pronouns continued to be regarded as a part of speech in Latin grammar (the Latin term being pronomen, from which the English name—through Middle French—ultimately derives), and thus in the European tradition generally.

Because of the many different syntactic roles that they play, pronouns are less likely to be a single word class in more modern approaches to grammar.

=== Linguistics ===
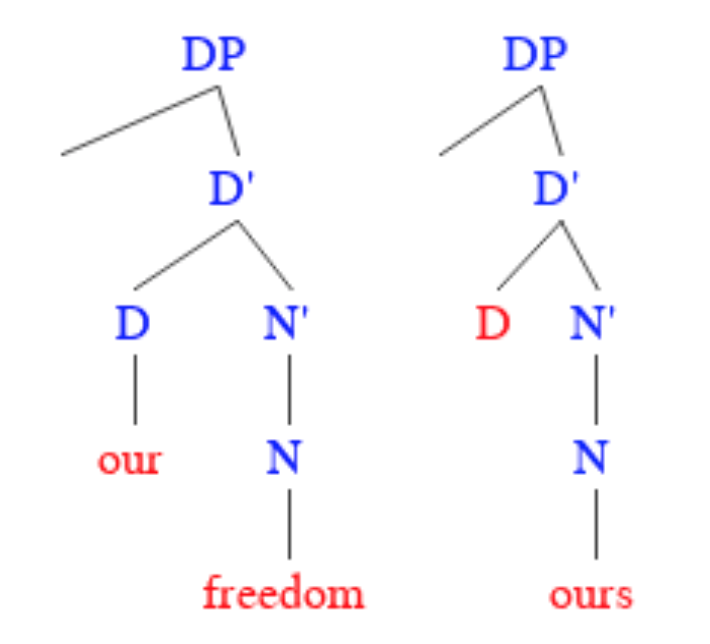
Examples of "our" as a determiner or a noun

Linguists in particular have trouble classifying pronouns in a single category, and some do not agree that pronouns substitute nouns or noun categories. Certain types of pronouns are often identical or similar in form to determiners with related meaning; some English examples are given in the table.

	Pronoun	Determiner
Possessive	ours	our freedom
Demonstrative	this	this gentleman
Indefinite	some	some frogs
Negative	none	no information
Interrogative	which	which option

This observation has led some linguists, such as Paul Postal, to regard pronouns as determiners that have had their following noun or noun phrase deleted. (Such patterning can even be claimed for certain personal pronouns; for example, we and you might be analyzed as determiners in phrases like we Brits and you tennis players.) Other linguists have taken a similar view, uniting pronouns and determiners into a single class, sometimes called "determiner-pronoun", or regarding determiners as a subclass of pronouns or vice versa. The distinction may be considered to be one of subcategorization or valency, rather like the distinction between transitive and intransitive verbs—determiners take a noun phrase complement like transitive verbs do, while pronouns do not. This is consistent with the determiner phrase viewpoint, whereby a determiner, rather than the noun that follows it, is taken to be the head of the phrase. Cross-linguistically, it seems as though pronouns share 3 distinct categories: point of view, person, and number. The breadth of each subcategory however tends to differ among languages.

==== Binding theory and antecedents ====
The use of pronouns often involves anaphora, where the meaning of the pronoun is dependent on another referential element. The referent of the pronoun is often the same as that of a preceding (or sometimes following) noun phrase, called the antecedent of the pronoun. The grammatical behavior of certain types of pronouns, and in particular their possible relationship with their antecedents, has been the focus of studies in binding, notably in the Chomskyan government and binding theory. In this binding context, reflexive and reciprocal pronouns in English (such as himself and each other) are referred to as anaphors (in a specialized restricted sense) rather than as pronominal elements. Under binding theory, specific principles apply to different sets of pronouns.

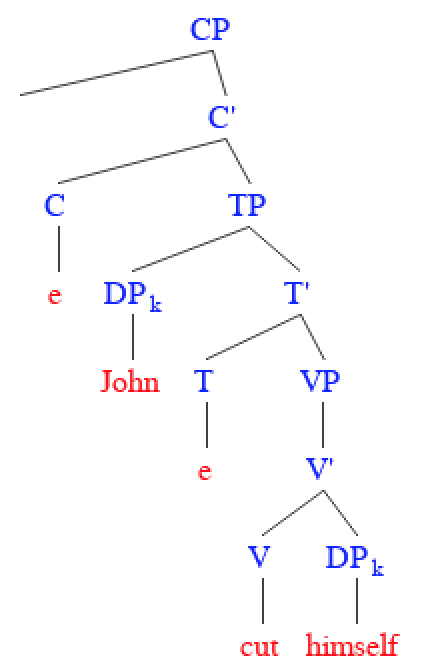
Example reflexive structure. Since "himself" is immediately dominated by "John", Principle A is satisfied.

In English, reflexive and reciprocal pronouns must adhere to Principle A: an anaphor (reflexive or reciprocal, such as "each other") must be bound in its governing category (roughly, the clause). Therefore, in syntactic structure it must be lower in structure (it must have an antecedent) and have a direct relationship with its referent. This is called a C-command relationship. For instance, we see that John cut himself is grammatical, but Himself cut John is not, despite having identical arguments, since himself, the reflexive, must be lower in structure to John, its referent. Additionally, we see examples like John said that Mary cut himself are not grammatical because there is an intermediary noun, Mary, that disallows the two referents from having a direct relationship.

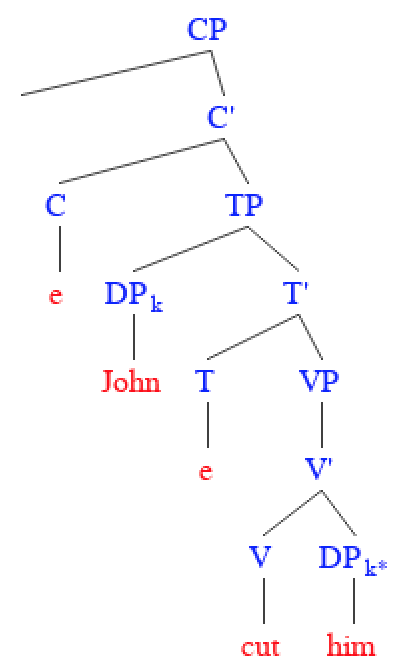
Example pronoun structure. Since "him" is immediately dominated by "John", Principle B is violated.

On the other hand, personal pronouns (such as him or them) must adhere to Principle B: a pronoun must be free (i.e., not bound) within its governing category (roughly, the clause). This means that although the pronouns can have a referent, they cannot have a direct relationship with the referent where the referent selects the pronoun. For instance, John said Mary cut him is grammatical because the two co-referents, John and him are separated structurally by Mary. This is why a sentence like John cut him where him refers to John is ungrammatical.

===== Binding cross-linguistically =====
The type of binding that applies to subsets of pronouns varies cross-linguistically. For instance, in German linguistics, pronouns can be split into two distinct categories—personal pronouns and d-pronouns. Although personal pronouns act identically to English personal pronouns (i.e. follow Principle B), d-pronouns follow yet another principle, Principle C, and function similarly to nouns in that they cannot have a direct relationship to an antecedent.

===== Antecedents =====
The following sentences give examples of particular types of pronouns used with antecedents:

- Third-person personal pronouns:
  - That poor man looks as if he needs a new coat. (the noun phrase that poor man is the antecedent of he)
  - Julia arrived yesterday. I met her at the station. (Julia is the antecedent of her)
  - When they saw us, the lions began roaring (the lions is the antecedent of they; as it comes after the pronoun it may be called a postcedent)
- Other personal pronouns in some circumstances:
  - Terry and I were hoping no one would find us. (Terry and I is the antecedent of us)
  - You and Alice can come if you like. (you and Alice is the antecedent of the second—plural—you)
- Reflexive and reciprocal pronouns:
  - Jack hurt himself. (Jack is the antecedent of himself)
  - We were teasing each other. (we is the antecedent of each other)
- Relative pronouns:
  - The woman who looked at you is my sister. (the woman is the antecedent of who)

Some other types, such as indefinite pronouns, are usually used without antecedents. Relative pronouns are used without antecedents in free relative clauses. Even third-person personal pronouns are sometimes used without antecedents ("unprecursed")—this applies to special uses such as dummy pronouns and generic they, as well as cases where the referent is implied by the context.

== English pronouns ==
English pronouns have often traditionally been classified as different from nouns, but at least one modern grammar defines them as a subclass of nouns.

English personal pronouns have a number of different syntactic contexts (Subject, Object, Possessive, Reflexive) and many features:

- person (1st, 2nd, 3rd);
- number (singular, plural);
- gender (masculine, feminine, neuter or inanimate, epicene)

Personal pronouns in standard Modern English
Person	Number & gender	Subject	Object	Dependent possessive (determiner)	Independent possessive	Reflexive
First	Singular	I	me	my	mine	myself
First	Plural	we	us	our	ours	ourselves
Second	Singular	you		your	yours	yourself
Second	Plural	you		your	yours	yourselves
Third	Masculine	he	him	his		himself
Third	Feminine	she	her		hers	herself
Third	Neuter/Inanimate	it		its	its	itself
Third	Epicene	they	them	their	theirs	themself/themselves
Third	Plural	they	them	their	theirs	themselves

English also has other pronoun types, including demonstrative, relative, indefinite, and interrogative pronouns:

Demonstrative	Relative	Indefinite	Interrogative
this	who / whom / whose	one / one's / oneself	who / whom / whose
these	what	something / anything / nothing (things)	what
that	which	someone / anyone / no one (people)	which
those	that	somebody / anybody / nobody (people)	
former / latter			

=== Personal and possessive ===
==== Personal ====
English personal pronouns
Person	Number	Case	
Person	Number	Subject	Object
First	Singular	I	me
First	Plural	we	us
Second	Singular	you	
Second	Plural	you	
Third	Singular	he	him
Third	Singular	she	her
Third	Singular	it	
Third	Singular	they	them
Third	Plural/Epicene	they	them

Personal pronouns may be classified by person, number, gender and case. English has three persons (first, second and third) and two numbers (singular and plural); in the third person singular there are also distinct pronoun forms for male, female and neuter gender. Principal forms are shown in the adjacent table.

English personal pronouns have two cases, subject and object. Subject pronouns are used in subject position (I like to eat chips, but she does not). Object pronouns are used for the object of a verb or preposition (John likes me but not her).

Other distinct forms found in some languages include:

- Second person informal and formal pronouns (the T–V distinction), like tu and vous in French. Formal second person pronouns can also signify plurality in many languages. There is no such distinction in standard modern English, though Elizabethan English marked the distinction with thou (singular informal) and you (plural or singular formal). Some dialects of English have developed informal plural second person pronouns, for instance, y'all (Southern American English) and you guys (American English).
- Inclusive and exclusive first person plural pronouns, which indicate whether or not the audience is included, that is, whether we means "you and I" or "they and I". There is no such distinction in English.
- Intensive (emphatic) pronouns, which re-emphasize a noun or pronoun that has already been mentioned. English uses the same forms as the reflexive pronouns; for example: I did it myself (contrast reflexive use, I did it to myself).
- Direct and indirect object pronouns, such as le and lui in French. English uses the same form for both; for example: Mary loves him (direct object); Mary sent him a letter (indirect object).
- Prepositional pronouns, used after a preposition. English uses ordinary object pronouns here: Mary looked at him.
- Disjunctive pronouns, used in isolation or in certain other special grammatical contexts, like moi in French. No distinct forms exist in English, the function being fulfilled by the object pronouns; for example: Who does this belong to? Me.
- Strong and weak forms of certain pronouns, found in some languages such as Polish.
- Pronoun avoidance, where personal pronouns are substituted by titles or kinship terms (particularly common in South-East Asia).

==== Possessive ====
Possessive pronouns are used to indicate possession (in a broad sense). Some occur as independent noun phrases: mine, yours, hers, ours, theirs. An example is: Those clothes are mine. Others act as a determiner and must accompany a noun: my, your, her, our, your, their, as in: I lost my wallet. (His and its can fall into either category, although its is nearly always found in the second.) Those of the second type have traditionally also been described as possessive adjectives, and in more modern terminology as possessive determiners. The term "possessive pronoun" is sometimes restricted to the first type. Both types replace possessive noun phrases. As an example, Their crusade to capture our attention could replace The advertisers' crusade to capture our attention.

=== Reflexive and reciprocal ===
Reflexive pronouns are used when a person or thing acts on itself, for example, John cut himself. In English they all end in -self or -selves and must refer to a noun phrase elsewhere in the same clause.

Reciprocal pronouns refer to a reciprocal relationship (each other, one another). They must refer to a noun phrase in the same clause. An example in English is: They do not like each other. In some languages, the same forms can be used as both reflexive and reciprocal pronouns.

=== Demonstrative ===
Demonstrative pronouns (in English, this, that and their plurals these, those) often distinguish their targets by pointing or some other indication of position; for example, I'll take these. They may also be anaphoric, depending on an earlier expression for context, for example, A kid actor would try to be all sweet, and who needs that?

=== Indefinite ===
Indefinite pronouns, the largest group of pronouns, refer to one or more unspecified persons or things. One group in English includes compounds of some-, any-, every- and no- with -thing, -one and -body, for example: Anyone can do that. Another group, including many, more, both, and most, can appear alone or followed by of. In addition,

- Distributive pronouns are used to refer to members of a group separately rather than collectively. (To each his own.)
- Negative pronouns indicate the non-existence of people or things. (Nobody thinks that.)
- Impersonal pronouns normally refer to a person but are not specific as to first, second or third person in the way that the personal pronouns are. (One does not clean one's own windows.)

=== Relative and interrogative ===
==== Relative ====
Relative pronouns in English include who, whom, whose, what, which and that. They rely on an antecedent, and refer back to people or things previously mentioned: People who smoke should quit now. They are used in relative clauses. Relative pronouns can also be used as complementizers.

==== Interrogative ====
Relative pronouns can be used in an interrogative setting as interrogative pronouns. Interrogative pronouns ask which person or thing is meant. In reference to a person, one may use who (subject), whom (object) or whose (possessive); for example, Who did that? In colloquial speech, whom is generally replaced by who. English non-personal interrogative pronouns (which and what) have only one form.

In English and many other languages (e.g. French and Czech), the sets of relative and interrogative pronouns are nearly identical. Compare English: Who is that? (interrogative) and I know the woman who came (relative). In some other languages, interrogative pronouns and indefinite pronouns are frequently identical; for example, Standard Chinese 什么 shénme means "what?" as well as "something" or "anything".

=== Archaic forms ===
Archaic personal pronouns
Person	Number	Case	
Person	Number	Subject	Object
Second	Singular	thou	thee
Second	Plural	ye	you

Though the personal pronouns described above are the current English pronouns, Early Modern English (as used by Shakespeare, for example) use a slightly different set of personal pronouns, shown in the table. The difference is entirely in the second person. Though one would rarely find these older forms used in recent literature, they are nevertheless considered part of Modern English.

=== Special uses ===
Some special uses of personal pronouns include:

- Generic you, where second person pronouns are used in an indefinite sense: You can't buy good old-fashioned bulbs these days.
- Generic they: In China they drive on the right.
- Gender non-specific uses, where a pronoun refers to a non-specific person or a person whose gender is not specified: English usage and acceptance varies (and has varied) regarding generic he and singular they, among others.
  - A closely related usage is the singular they to refer to a person whose gender is specified as non-binary, genderqueer, or other, which has gained popularity in LGBTQ+ culture in particular. Both themselves/themself work as the reflexive form of this pronoun.
- Preferred gender pronoun selected to reflect gender identity
- Dummy pronouns (expletive pronouns), used to satisfy a grammatical requirement for a noun or pronoun, but contributing nothing to its meaning: It is raining.
- Royal we, used to refer to a single person who is a monarch: We are not amused.
- Nosism: The use of the pronoun we to refer to oneself.
- Resumptive pronouns, "intrusive" personal pronouns found (for example) in some relative clauses where a gap (trace) might be expected: This is the girl that I don't know what she said.

== See also ==
=== Related topics ===
- Anaphora (linguistics)
- Cataphora
- Clusivity
- Gender-specific and gender-neutral pronouns
- Generic antecedents
- Deixis
- Inalienable possession
- Indefinite pronoun
- Logophoric pronoun
- Neopronouns
- Phi features
- Pro-form
- Pronominal adverb
- Pronoun game
- Reciprocal pronoun
- Reflexive pronoun

=== In English ===
- Old English pronouns

=== In other languages ===
- Bulgarian pronouns
- Cantonese pronouns
- Chinese pronouns
- Dutch grammar: Pronouns and determiners
- Esperanto grammar: Pronouns
- French pronouns
- German pronouns
- Ido pronouns
- Interlingua pronouns
- Irish morphology: Pronouns
- Italian grammar: Pronouns
- Japanese pronouns
- Korean pronouns
- Macedonian pronouns
- Novial: Pronouns
- Portuguese personal pronouns
- Proto-Indo-European pronouns
- Slovene pronouns
- Spanish grammar: Pronouns
- Vietnamese pronouns
