= Personal pronouns in French =

Aspect of French grammar

French personal pronouns (analogous to English I, you, he/she, we, they, etc.) reflect the person and number of their referent, and in the case of the third person, its gender as well (much like the English distinction between him and her, except that French lacks an inanimate third person pronoun it or a gender neutral they and thus draws this distinction among all third person nouns, singular and plural). They also reflect the role they play in their clause: subject, direct object, indirect object, or other.

Personal pronouns display a number of grammatical particularities and complications not found in their English counterparts: some of them can only be used in certain circumstances; some of them change form depending on surrounding words; and their placement is largely unrelated to the placement of the nouns they replace.

== Overview ==
French personal pronouns
		Function						
Person	Number	Subject	Reflexive	Direct object	Indirect object	Disjunctive	Disjunctive reflexive	Genitive
1st	Singular	je (Note: je, me, te, se, le, and la become j', m', t', s', l', and l', respectively, before a vowel or mute h. See Elision (French).)	me			moi		-
1st	Plural (colloquial)	on (Note: In formal French, the pronoun on is often replaced by l'on after a vowel (in particular after et, ou, qui, que, quoi and si); in particular, formal French often replaces si on and qu'on with si l'on and que l'on, respectively. This does not affect the meaning, only the pronunciation. In modern French, on has replaced nous as pronoun for the plural first person. Nous is used in formal usage.) (Note: The verbs are always conjugated in the 3rd person singular with on, se and soi; and in the 2nd person plural with vous.)	se	nous			soi	-
1st	Plural (formal)	nous						-
2nd	Singular (informal)	tu	te			toi		-
2nd	Singular (formal)	vous						-
2nd	Plural	vous						-
3rd	Singular	il (Note: The pronoun il and its forms refer to males (like English "he"), while the pronoun elle and its forms refer to females (like English "she"). However, as all French nouns (even inanimate and intangible objects) are either grammatically masculine or feminine, these pronouns can also refer to masculine and feminine nouns. In this case, both il and elle translate to the English pronoun "it". Il can furthermore be used as the direct equivalent of the English impersonal dummy pronoun "it" in order to refer to unspecified neuter things such as facts and ideas (e.g. Il pleut – "It's raining").)	se	le	lui/y (Note: Broadly speaking, lui and leur are used to refer to people, and y (see below) is used to refer to things. Lui and leur, however, will sometimes also be used to refer to things.)	lui	soi	en
3rd	Singular	elle	se	la	lui/y	elle	soi	en
3rd	Singular	on	se	-	lui/y	-	soi	en
3rd	Plural	ils (Note: In French, a group containing at least one male or one masculine noun is considered masculine, and takes the pronoun ils. Only exclusively female or feminine groups take elles.)	se	les	leur/y	eux	soi	en
3rd	Plural	elles	se	les	leur/y	elles	soi	en

=== The second person ===
French has a T-V distinction in the second person singular. That is, it uses two different sets of pronouns: tu and vous and their various forms.

The usage of tu and vous depends on the kind of relationship (formal or informal) that exists between the speaker and the person with whom they are speaking and the age differences between these subjects. The pronoun tu is informal and singular, spoken to an individual who is equal or junior to the speaker. The pronoun vous is used in the singular (but with second-person plural verb forms) to speak to an individual who is senior to the speaker or socially "more important" than the speaker. Vous is also used in the plural for all groups of people, whether junior, equal or senior.

== Subject pronouns ==
As noted above, the personal pronouns change form to reflect the role they play in their clause. The forms used for subjects are called the subject pronouns, subjective pronouns, or nominative pronouns. They are as follows:

		singular	plural
first person	informal	je	on
first person	formal	je	nous
second person	informal	tu	vous
second person	formal	vous	vous
third person	masculine	il	ils
third person	feminine	elle	elles

When the predicate is être ('to be') plus a noun phrase, the pronoun ce (c' in elision contexts) is normally used instead of the other third person subject pronouns. For example, « C'est un homme intelligent » ("He is a smart man"), « Ce sont mes parents » ("Those are my parents"). Ce is primarily used as a "neuter" pronoun to refer to events and situations: « J'ai vu Jean hier. C'était amusant. », "I saw John yesterday. It was fun."

Another "neuter" pronoun is il when used as the "dummy subject" of an impersonal verb, like English it in the same context: Il pleut 'it is raining', il neige 'it is snowing', il grêle 'it is hailing', il vente 'it is windy', il faut que … 'it is necessary that …', etc.

Neologisms such as iel(le), ille, ul, ol and yul have emerged in recent years as gender-neutral alternatives to the masculine and feminine pronouns, but are not yet considered standard in French despite their use in some speech communities. Iel (plural iels) is the most widely-known and used gender-neutral pronoun.

The third person plural is masculine (ils) when a group contains both males and females or masculine and feminine nouns.

=== On ===
The subject pronoun on (from Old French [h]om, homme 'man', from Latin homo 'human being') takes third-person singular verb forms in the same way that il and elle do, and is used:

- In the same way as English one, you, and they, where the subject is generalised or otherwise unclear or unimportant:

« C'est en forgeant que l'on devient forgeron. » "It is by blacksmithing that one becomes a blacksmith."
« penser que l'on a raison » "to think that you are right," i.e. "to think oneself right."

- As an extension of the above, it is often used to avoid the passive voice in French:

« On me l'a donné. » "[Someone] gave it to me." In English, it would be more common to say, "It was given to me.", which would be rendered as « Ça / il / elle m'a été donné(e). » in French.

- To replace the subject pronoun nous in informal speech. In this case, on takes plural adjectives, even though it always takes a third-person singular verb. The corresponding reflexive object pronoun, se, is also third-person, but first-person possessive pronouns must be used when on meaning nous is the antecedent. The associated disjunctive pronoun in this context is nous.

« On est sur le point de partir. » "We are about to go."
« Nous, on est américains, et vous, vous êtes français. » "Us, we are American, and you, you are French."
« On se débarrasse de nos bagages ? » "Shall we get rid of our luggage?"

Colloquial replacement of nous by on
			Function				
Number	Person		Subject	Reflexive	Direct object	Indirect object	Disjunctive
Plural	1st	formal	nous				
Plural	1st	informal	on	se	nous		

It is never used for the number one, or as in one of them. As in English, numbers can be used as pronouns, and this is also true of the French word un(e):

« Deux sont entrés et un est ressorti » "Two went in and one came back out."

On has limited pronoun forms: it has only a reflexive form, se, and a disjunctive form soi (which is also only used when the sense is reflexive). The pronoun quelqu'un ('someone') can sometimes be used to fill the roles of on:

« Quelqu'un m'a dit... » "Someone told me..."

== Direct-object pronouns ==
Like the English him, her, it, and them, the pronouns le, la, and les are only used with definite direct objects. For indefinite ones (e.g., "some juice"), en is used; see § The pronoun en, below.

		singular	plural
first person		me	nous
second person	informal	te	vous
second person	formal	vous	vous
third person	masculine	le	les
third person	feminine	la	les

Le, la, and les are not used when the direct object refers to the same entity as the subject; see § Reflexive pronouns, below.

Examples:

- (I have a book.) I am giving it to the teacher. « Je le donne au prof. »
- (Danielle is my sister.) Have you seen her? « Est-ce que tu l'as vue ? »

== Indirect-object pronouns ==
		singular	plural
first person		me	nous
second person	informal	te	vous
second person	formal	vous	vous
third person		lui	leur

In French, an indirect object is an object of a verb that is introduced using a preposition (especially the preposition à). For example, in the sentence « J'ai parlé à Jean » ("I spoke to Jean"), Jean is the indirect object in the French sentence.

Indirect-object pronouns (or dative pronouns) generally only replace indirect objects with the preposition à. When an indirect object pronoun is used, it replaces the entire prepositional phrase; for example, « Je lui ai donné un livre » ("I gave him a book").

Broadly speaking, lui and leur are used to refer to people, and y (see § The pronoun y, below) is used to refer to things. However, lui and leur will sometimes also be used in referring to things.

Lui, leur, and y are replaced with se (s' before a vowel) when the indirect object refers to the same entity as the subject; see § Reflexive pronouns, below.

As mentioned above, the indirect object pronouns are not always used to replace indirect objects:

- They are not used when the preposition is de rather than à; but see § The pronoun en, below.
- Some verbs are incompatible with indirect object pronouns, such as penser ('to think about') and all reflexive verbs. For example, one says, « Je me fie à lui » ("I put my trust in him"), not « * Je me lui fie ».

== Reflexive pronouns ==
		singular	plural
first person		me	nous
second person	informal	te	vous
second person	formal	vous	vous
third person		se	

In French, as in English, reflexive pronouns are used in place of direct- and indirect-object pronouns that refer to the same entity or entities as the subject. A verb with a reflexive pronoun is called a reflexive verb, and has many grammatical particularities aside from the choice of pronoun; see French verbs.

There are four kinds of reflexive verbs:

1. Verbs that are inherently reflexive. For example, the verb se souvenir ('to remember') has no non-reflexive counterpart; the verb souvenir has no meaning on its own.
2. Verbs whose direct or indirect objects refer to the same entities as their subjects. For example, « Je m'achèterai cela » ("I shall buy myself that") is just a special case of « Je lui achèterai cela » ("I shall buy him that") that happens to be reflexive.
3. Verbs indicating reciprocal actions. For example, « Ils se parlent » means "They are talking to each other." In cases of possible ambiguity, the reciprocal interpretation can be reinforced by adding « Ils se parlent l'un à l'autre ».
4. Verbs indicating a passive action. For example, one might say, « La porte s'ouvre », which literally means, "The door is opening itself," but really means, "The door is opening."

All four kinds use the reflexive pronouns, and exhibit the grammatical particularities of reflexive verbs.

== Disjunctive pronouns ==
		singular	plural
first person		moi	nous
second person	informal	toi	vous
second person	formal	vous	vous
third person	masculine	lui	eux
third person	feminine	elle	elles

Disjunctive pronouns are the strong forms of French pronouns, the forms used in isolation and in emphatic positions (compare the use of me in the English sentence "Me, I believe you, but I am not sure anyone else will"; for more, see Intensive pronoun).

In French, disjunctive pronouns are used in the following circumstances:

- as the objects of prepositions: « Je le fais pour toi », "I am doing it for you."
- in dislocated positions: « Toi, je t'ai déjà vu, moi. », "You, I have seen you before, I have."
- in cleft sentences: « C'est toi qui as tort », "It is you who are wrong." lit. "It is you who have error/wrong."
- in compound noun phrases: « Lui et moi sommes américains », "He and I are American" (though one might equally say, « Lui et moi, nous sommes américains / on est américains »).
- as emphatic subjects (third person only): « Lui sait le faire », "He knows how to do it" (though one might equally say, « Lui, il sait le faire »).

The reflexive disjunctive form soi can be used as the object of a preposition, if it refers to the same entity as the subject. For example, « Un voyageur sait se sentir chez soi n'importe où », "A traveller knows how to feel at home anywhere." Note that this does not make the verb reflexive.

== Enclitic pronouns ==
While most clitic pronouns precede the verb, two categories of pronouns can be suffixed to it instead : subject pronouns in the case of inversion, and object pronouns of non-negated imperative verbs.

Enclitic pronouns are pronounced together with the verb, causing the word-final stress to retract onto the pronoun, with the exceptions of -je and -ce, which are non-syllabic and merely add a consonant to the final syllable of the preceding verb.

=== Enclitic subject pronouns ===
		spelling	pronunciation
first person	singular	-je	/ʒ/, /ɛʒ/ (Note: When appended to verb forms that end in an orthographical -e, that e is pronounced /ɛ/ and changed to é (traditional orthography) or è (alternative orthography) : j'accepte -> accepté-je This mostly occurs with the present tense of 1st group verbs. It is awkward and generally avoided altogether.)
first person	plural	-nous	/nu/
second person	singular	-tu	/ty/
second person	plural	-vous	/vu/
third person	singular	-il, -t-il (Note: All inverted 3rd person subject pronouns start with a /t/ sound : that sound is represented in writing as a liaison with the preceding verb form if it ends in an orthographical t or d : if the verb ends in any other letter, an extra -t- infix is added in the spelling.)	/til/
third person	singular	-elle, -t-elle	/tɛl/
third person	singular	-on, -t-on	/tɔ̃/
third person	singular	-ce (Note: Only used with être. Combinations other than est-ce, était-ce and serait-ce are rare and awkward.)	/s/
third person	plural	-ils, -t-ils	/til/
third person	plural	-elles, -t-elles	/tɛl/

Enclitic subject pronouns are mostly used when forming questions. They are also used after some sentence-initial adverbs and adverbial phrases, and in a handful of other non-interrogative sentence structures :

- Qui **êtes-vous** ? (interrogative)
- Peut-être **est-il** déjà trop tard. (adverbial phrase "peut-être" causes inversion)
- « C'en est assez ! » **s'exclama-t-il**. (inversion after quotation)

=== Enclitic object pronouns ===
Forms that deviate from their proclitic equivalents and irregular or noteworthy pronunciations are highlighted in bold.

		Proclitic form	Enclitic form	pronunciation
first person	singular	me, m'	**-moi**	/mwa/
first person	plural	nous	-nous	/nu/
second person	singular	te, t'	**-toi**	/twa/
second person	plural	vous	-vous	/vu/
third person	singular	le, l'	-le	**/lø/**
third person	singular	la, l'	-la	/la/
third person	singular	lui	-lui	/lɥi/
third person	singular	y	-y	**/zi/** (Note: The invered forms -y and -en start in a /z/ sound : that sound is represented in writing as a liaison with the preceding verb form if it ends in an orthographical s, x or z : if the verb ends in a vowel instead, as is the case with many singular imperative forms, an extra -s is added at the end of the verb.)
third person	singular	en	-en	**/zɑ̃/**
third person	plural	les	-les	/le/
third person	plural	leur	-leur	/lœʁ/

Enclitic object pronouns are exclusively used after imperative verbs : when the imperative is negated, proclitic forms are used instead.

- Vas**-y** ! - N'**y** va pas !

== The pronoun y ==
The pronoun y has two distinct uses:

- It is the indirect-object pronoun used with things introduced by the preposition à. For more on this use, see above.
- It is used to replace a spatial prepositional phrase. In this sense, it might be translated as there. For example:
  « Je vais à Paris. » → « J'y vais. » ("I am going to Paris." → "I am going there.")
  « Est-ce que tu travailles dans ce bureau ? — Non, je n'y travaille plus. » ("Do you work in that office? — No, I do not work there anymore.")
- It is used idiomatically with certain verbs, without replacing anything:
  « Il doit y avoir une erreur. » ("There must be a mistake.")
  « Je commence à y voir un peu plus clair. » ("I am starting to see things more clearly.")

== The pronoun en ==
The pronoun en has the following uses:

- It is the indirect-object pronoun used with things (including infinitives) introduced by the preposition de. It is also sometimes used in the same way with people (however, it is more common to use disjunctive pronouns rather than using en in the case of people).:
  « Je parle du problème. » → « J'en parle. » ("I am talking about the problem." → "I am talking about it.")
  « Je parle de Jean. » → « J'en parle. » or « Je parle de lui. » ("I am talking about Jean." → "I am talking about him.")
- It is used to replace a spatial prepositional phrase introduced by de ("from"). In this sense, it might be translated as from there:
  « Je viens de France. » → « J'en viens. » ("I come from France." → "I come from there.")
- It is the direct-object pronoun used to replace indefinite direct objects; that is, direct objects that are:
  - introduced by the partitive article (including the plural indefinite article)
    « J'ai bu du jus de pomme. » → « J'en ai bu. » ("I drank some apple juice." → "I drank some.")
  - introduced by de when the verb is negated
    « Je n'ai pas vu de vaches. » → Je n'en ai pas vu. ("I did not see any cows." → "I did not see any.")
  - introduced by a numeral (including the singular indefinite article) or a plural expression (d'autres, certains, quelques)
    « J'ai mangé une pomme. » → « J'en ai mangé une. » ("I ate an apple." → "I ate one.")
    « J'ai mangé quelques pommes. » → J'en ai mangé quelques-unes. ("I ate a number of apples." → "I ate a number of them.")
  - introduced by another expression of quantity (usually an adverb + de)
    « J'ai vendu beaucoup de jus de pomme. » → « J'en ai vendu beaucoup. » ("I sold a lot of apple juice." → "I sold a lot.")
    « J'ai acheté trois kilogrammes de pommes. » → « J'en ai acheté trois kilogrammes. » ("I bought three kilograms of apples." → "I bought three kilograms.")
- It is used idiomatically with certain verbs, without replacing anything:
  « J'en veux à Jean. » ("I am mad at Jean.")
  « Je vais en finir avec lui. » ("I am going to finish things off with him.")

== Clitic order ==
French personal pronouns, aside from their disjunctive forms, are all clitics, and the order of pronominal clitics as well as the negative clitic ne is strictly determined as follows. Only one clitic can be used for each slot. Where one wishes to express an idea that would involve slots that cannot coexist or multiple pronouns from the same slot, the indirect object is expressed as the object of à or pour (thus Je me donne à toi – "I give myself to you"). The use of more than two clitics beyond the subject and, where necessary, ne is uncommon; constructions such as Je lui y en ai donné may be perceived as unacceptable, and other constructions must then be used to express the same ideas.

Proclitic order
Slots 3 and 5 cannot coexist.

Number	Person	Slot						
Number	Person	1	2	3	4	5	6	7
Number	Person	Nom	Neg	Obj	COD	COI	Loc	Gen
Singular	1st	je	ne	me				
Singular	2nd	tu	ne	te				
Singular	3rd	il	ne	se	le	lui	y	en
Singular	3rd	elle	ne	se	la	lui	y	en
Singular	3rd	on	ne	se	le/la	lui		
Plural	1st	nous	ne	nous				
Plural	2nd	vous	ne	vous				
Plural	3rd	ils	ne	se	les	leur	y	en
Plural	3rd	elles	ne	se	les	leur	y	en

Enclitic order
Used only for positive imperatives. Slots 2 and 3 cannot coexist.

Number	Person	Slot				
Number	Person	1	2	3	4	5
Number	Person	COD	COI	Obj	Loc	Gen
Singular	1st			-moi^{1}		
Singular	2nd			-toi^{1}		
Singular	3rd	-le	-lui		(-z)-y^{1}	(-z)-en^{1}
Singular	3rd	-la	-lui		(-z)-y^{1}	(-z)-en^{1}
Plural	1st			-nous		
Plural	2nd			-vous		
Plural	3rd	-les	-leur		(-z)-y^{1}	(-z)-en^{1}

1. The clitics -moi and -toi become -m' and -t' respectively when followed by either -en or -y. In colloquial French, however, it is possible to keep -moi and -toi intact and change -en and -y to -z-en and -z-y respectively, or to put slot 5 before slot 3, or less commonly, before slot 1 or 2.
  ex. The imperative sentences corresponding to « Tu m'en donnes »:
  « Donne-m'en. » /dɔn.mɑ̃/ (formal)
  « Donne-moi-z-en. » /dɔn.mwa.zɑ̃/ (informal)
  « Donnes-en-moi. » /dɔn.zɑ̃.mwa/ (informal)

== See also ==
- French pronouns
- Neuter gender in modern and contemporary French
