= Pronouns in Slovene =

Word class in the Slovene language

The Slovene language has a range of pronouns that in some ways work quite differently from English ones. This page details their usage. For declensions, see Slovene declension#Pronouns.

== Pronoun ==
Pronouns can replace a noun in a sentence; this is, as opposed to, say, an adjective or an adverb.

=== Personal pronouns ===
A personal pronoun denotes the speaker (I), the addressee (you) or a third person (it). Personal pronouns in Slovene are inflected in a somewhat unusual way, for there are many different forms for each of the pronouns.

Several of the pronouns have unstressed and clitic forms that are unstressed, and may attach to another word. For example:

- Zanj mi je dal denar. "He gave me the money for him." (Note: if the 'he' was referring to the same person, the reflexive personal pronoun would be used.)
- Za njega mi je dal denar. "He gave me the money for him (in particular)."
- Sledili smo jim. "We followed them."
- Spodbudili smo jih, da naj se pokažejo vredne našega zaupanja, a so nas nesramno zavrnili. "We encouraged them to prove themselves worthy of our trust, but they rejected us rudely."
- Nanjo se je zgrnila ena nesreča za drugo. "She was struck by one misfortune after another."
- Da bi le njim to lahko dopovedali! "If only we could make them understand this!"
- Zame ni več rešitve: pugubljena sem. "For me there is no solution any more: I am doomed."
- Pogledal ga je s kancem ironije v očeh. "He looked at him with a drop of irony in the eyes."
- Pogledal je njega. "He looked at him (in particular)."

The nominative forms of personal pronouns are not used in neutral sentences, only when emphasizing the subject, especially so for the first person singular jaz "I". This is because unlike in English, the form of the verb gives all applicable information such as the gender, grammatical number and person by itself.

- Jaz mislim drugače. "I (in particular, or contrasting) think otherwise."

The reflexive pronoun begins with s- and is used to refer back to the subject, or to some other word.

For example:

- Umivam si roke. "I am washing my hands."
- Umivate si roke. "You are washing your hands."
- Umivam se. "I am washing myself."
- Umivate se. "You are washing yourselves."

Similarly as in German and English, the reflexive pronoun can sometimes be replaced by the reciprocal phrase drug drugega "each other, one another". Thus:

- Drug drugemu umivata roke. "The two of them are washing each other's hands."
- Umivata drug drugega. "The two of them are washing each other."

The accusative se can bind with prepositional words just like other personal pronouns:

- Nase je nanesla lepotilno kremo. "She put beautifying cream on herself."
- Ampak ko dela zase, dela učinkovito. "But when he/she works for him-/herself, he/she works efficiently."

Other cases and examples:

- Sebi gradi grobnico. "He/She is building a tomb for him-/herself."
- Gradi si grobnico. "He/She is building a tomb for him-/herself." (The emphasis here is not so much on for whom the tomb is, but rather the tomb or the building itself.)
- S sabo/seboj ni zadovoljna. "She is not happy with herself."
- Najprej počisti pri sebi, potlej šele kritiziraj druge! "First clean up at yourself, only then criticise others!"
- Ko je videl odsev sebe v ogledalu, mu je ta pogled povsem pokvaril dan. "When he saw the reflexion of himself in the mirror, this sight completely ruined the day for him." (Not a widely used construction, this would be more usually expressed with the possessive adjective: Ko je videl svoj odsev v ogledalu ...)

=== Interrogative pronouns ===
The interrogative pronouns introduce direct and indirect questions. There are two nominative forms: kdo "who" and kaj "what".

- Kaj je ta stvar, ki se premika? "What is this thing that is moving?"
- Vprašal sem ga, o kom je bil govoril. "I asked him about whom he had been talking."
- Komu naj dam to? "To whom ought I to give this?"
- Česa ne smem storiti? "What may I not do?"

=== Relative pronouns ===
The substantival relative pronoun is derived from the interrogative by adding -r: kdor "who, that", kar "which, that".

- Kdor krade, ni pošten. "Someone who steals is not honest."
- Kar poveš, tega ne moreš več obvladovati. "Something that you say, that you cannot control any more."
- Odrekli so ji možnost do izbire odvetnika, s čimer je bila kršena njena ustavna pravica. "They refused her the option of choosing a solicitor, with which her constitutional right was violated."

=== Negative pronouns ===
The negative pronoun is derived from the interrogative as well, and starts with ni-: nihče "nobody, anybody", nič "nothing, anything".

A negative pronoun demands a negative predicate, resulting in the so-called double negation:

- Nihče me nikoli ni maral. "Nobody ever liked me."
- Nikjer ni nikogar. "There is no one anywhere."
- Nič ni resnično. "Nothing is real."
- Od nikogar ne želim ničesar. "I want nothing from no one." or more freely "I don't want anything from anyone."
- Nikogaršnja neolikanost ni nikdar in nikjer in na nikakršen način nikomur pridobila nič drugega kot neodobravanje. "No one's impropriety gained ever anyone anywhere and in whatever way anything else than disapproval."

=== Universal pronouns ===
The universal pronouns are vsakdo "everyone" and vse "everything, all".

- Vsemu so namenjali pozornost. "They dedicated attention to everything."
- Vsakogar bodo vrgli iz službe, če ne bo izpolnjeval zahtev. "They will sack everyone who will not fulfil requirements."

Vsak "each, every" is an adjective that can function as a pronoun. Also in this category are vsakateri and vsakteri, both meaning "everyone", which are old-fashioned and not used in modern language.

=== Indefinite pronouns ===
The indefinite pronoun is derived from the interrogative, and starts with ne-: nekdo "someone, anyone", nekaj "something, anything". It refers to an unknown or deliberately untold person or object. The inflection follows the pattern of kdo and kaj.

- Nekoga so videli stati ob oknu, a niso mogli ugotoviti, kdo bi to lahko bil. "They saw someone standing near the window, but they could not figure out who could have been that."
- Zgodilo se je nekaj strašnega! "Something horrible has happened!"
- Zataknilo se jima je pri nečem, a nikakor se ne morem spomniti, pri čem. "They faltered at something, but I cannot in any way remember at what."
- Nekdo prihaja. Skrijmo se. "Someone is coming. Let us hide."

The interrogatives kdo and kaj, can also refer to any unspecified person or object, or one that can be chosen at will.

- Sporoči mi, prosim, če se bo kaj spremenilo. "Please let me know if anything changes."
- Seveda dvomim o čem: kaj to ni normalno? "Naturally I doubt about something: is this not normal?"
- Česa podobnega še nisem videl! "I have never seen anything like that!"
- Uporabi klorovodikovo kislino ali kaj drugega, da nevtraliziraš to bazo. "Use hydrochloric acid or something else to neutralise this base."
- Denar, ki si ga kdo sposodi, seveda ni njegov, pač pa z njim le upravlja. "Money that someone borrows is obviously not his; he merely manages it."
- Naj stopi kdo vendar do tega DJ-ja in ga nekajkrat lopne po glavi. "May someone go to this DJ and smack him on the head a few times."
- Ojej, kakšne lepe govorice! O tem se res moram s kom pogovoriti. "Oh dear, what beautiful gossip! I really must talk to someone about this."

=== Relative indefinite pronouns ===
The relative indefinite pronouns are kdorkoli or kdor koli (whoever) and karkoli or kar koli (whatever). The meaning conveyed is very similar to the unspecified pronoun. The inflexion follows the pattern of the relative pronoun with -koli or koli appended. The space, as shown, is optional, but for sake of consistency, once one method has been adopted, one should not use the other.

- Kdorkoli pokliče 112, mora znati povedati, kaj je narobe. "Whoever rings 112 must know how to say what is wrong."
- Kogarkoli poslušam od teh politikov, vsi govorijo iste neumnosti. "To whichever of these politicians I listen, they all speak the same stupidities."
- Karkoli stori, stori to dobro. "Whatever he/she does, he/she does it well."

=== Manifold pronouns ===
The manifold pronouns are marsikdo "many (people)" and marsikaj "many (things)". The inflexion follows the basic pattern of kdo and kaj. Although these pronouns refer to multiple people or things, they are grammatically singular. In addition to marsi-, other prefixes are possible, such as redko- (redkokdo "rarely anyone"), mnogo- (mnogokdo, same as marsikdo, although perhaps somewhat less usual) and malo- (malokdo "few (people)").

- Marsikdo pravi, da je lepše živeti na deželi, a jaz jim seveda ne verjamem. "Many people say that it is nicer to live in the countryside, but I of course do not believe them."
- Res je, da marsičesa ne vem, pa vendar veš ti še mnogo manj. "It is true that I do not know many things, but you know far less still."
- Z marsičim je že bila obdarjena, a česa takšnega, kar ji je prinesel egiptovski odposlanec, ni bila nikdar poprej še videla. "Many things she had been gifted, but something like that which the Egyptian emissary brought she had never before seen."
- Redkokdo bi priznal, da je storil takšno napako. "Rarely anyone would admit that he has made such a mistake."
- Mnogokaj mi je šlo po glavi, a bolje je, da ne povem, kaj. "Many things went through my mind, but it is better that I do not say which."
- Maločesa se loti, če ve, da se popolnosti pri stvari ne da doseči. "He attempts to do few things if he knows that perfection cannot be achieved at them."

== Determiners ==
=== Possessive determiners ===
These all inflect as regular adjectives.

	Singular	Dual	Plural
1st person	mój "my"	nájin "our"	nàš "our"
2nd person	tvój "your"	vájin "your"	vàš "your"
Reflexive	svój "one's (own)"		
3rd person masculine	njegôv, njegòv "his"	njún "their"	njíhov "their"
3rd person feminine	njén "her"	njún "their"	njíhov "their"
3rd person neuter	njegôv, njegòv "its"	njún "their"	njíhov "their"

Example sentences:

- Moj bog pravi drugače! "My god says otherwise!"
- Njegove oči so kot kupi koruze na polju. "His eyes are like heaps of maize on a field."
- Letalo je bilo last vojske in njene države. "The aeroplane was the property of the military and her (the military's or another person's, depending on the context) country.
- Vaše kraljevo veličanstvo, klanjam se pred Vami. "Your royal highness, I bow before You."
- Cerkev je njen grob na pokopališču prodala, kajti njeni potomci niso imeli dovolj denarja, da bi plačali pristojbino. "The church has sold her grave at the graveyard, since her descendants did not have enough money to pay the fee."
- S tvojim avtom smo šli: saj ne zameriš, kajne? "We went with your car: you do not resent (us), do you?"

The reflexive determiner svoj is used much as the reflexive pronoun is used, to point back to the subject or another word.

- Stopam v svojo sobo. "I am walking into my room."
- Kupili so jim lepo darilo; vso svojo domiselnost so vložili v njegovo izbiranje. "They bought them a beautiful gift; all their ingenuity they have invested into its choosing."
- Svojega leva je pustila na dežju. "She left her lion in the rain."

The reflexive possessive and 'normal' possessive pronouns make some ambiguous English sentences perfectly clear in Slovene. The sentence "She has taken her towel into the bathroom" can be translated into the following two ways:

- Njeno brisačo je vzela v kopalnico. (the towel she has taken belongs to another person)
- Svojo brisačo je vzela v kopalnico. (the towel she has taken is her own)

=== Other determiners ===
	Qualitative (Kakovostni)	Relational (Vrstni)	Possessive (Svojilni)	Quantitative (Količinski)
Interrogative (Vprašalni)	kakšen, kolikšen (what kind of, to what extent)	kateri (which, what)	čigav (whose)	koliko (how much, how many)
Relative (Oziralni)	kakršen (the kind that)	kateri, ki (which, that)	čigar, katerega (whose)	kolikor (as much)
Negative (Nikalni)	nikakršen (of no kind)	noben, nobeden (no one)	nikogar, ničesar (of no one, of nothing)	nič, noben (nothing, none)
Total (Celostni)	vsakršen (of every kind)	vsak (everyone)	vsakogar, vsega (of everyone, of everything)	ves, oba (all, both)
Indefinite (Nedoločni)	nekak(šen) (some kind of)	neki (some(one))	nekoga, nečesa (someone's, something's)	nekoliko (somewhat)
Unspecified (Poljubnostni)	kak(šen)	kateri	čigav	koliko
Relative Unspecified (Oziralni poljubnostni)	kakršenkoli (whatever kind)	katerikoli (whichever)	čigarkoli (whosever)	kolikorkoli (however much)
Mnogostni (Manifold)	marsikak(šen) (of many kinds)	marsikateri	marsičigav	dokaj, precej (quite a bit, quite a lot)
Differential (Drugostni)	drugačen (different)	drug (someone else)	drugega (of someone else)	ne toliko (not that/as much)
Equal (Istostni)	enak (of the same kind)	isti (the same)	istega (of the same one)	enako (the same [amount])
Demonstrative (Kazalni)	tak(šen) (of this kind)	ta, tisti, oni (that one)	tega (of that one)	toliko (this much)

Quantitative adverbial pronouns are non-inflected at all times. All other pronouns are normally inflected.

Examples:

- Čeprav mi je tisti avtobus bolj všeč, moram na tega, kajti tisti drugi vozi v drugo smer. "Even though I like that bus more, I have to board this one, for that other one is driving in another direction."
- Mnogokakšna želja se mi je že uresničila, vendar mi je marsikatera prinesla tudi kakšne stranske neprijetnosti. "Many a wish has come true for me, however many (a wish) has brought me some side inconveniences."
- Vlak, ki smo ga videli, je pravzaprav tisti, na katerega bi se bili morali usesti. "The train that we have seen is actually the one onto which we should have boarded." (literally: sat on)
- čigav svinčnik je to? "Whose pencil is this?"
- Nekakšna radirka je bila nameščena na drugem koncu. "Some type of rubber was mounted on the other end."
- Enak kalkulator imam kot ti. "I have the same type of calculator as you."
- Vzemi mnenje, katerega ne odobravaš, in ga poskusi spremeniti. "Take an opinion that you do not approve of and try to change it."
- Nekoliko pozni ste, a nič ne de. "You are somewhat late, but that is all right."
- Zaradi nekega bedaka mi je vsako letalo ušlo. "Because of some fool, every aeroplane got away from me. (I missed every plane because of some fool; in the sense that this person has taught me to get to an airport too late or similar, not that all planes have left without me.)
- Toliko truda za nič učinka. "So much effort to no avail."
