= Pronouns in Bulgarian =

Words in Bulgarian that substitute for a noun or noun phrase

Pronouns in Bulgarian change according to gender, number, definiteness and case. Pronouns are classified as: personal, possessive, interrogative, demonstrative, reflexive, universal, negative, indefinite and relative.

== Personal pronouns ==
In Bulgarian, there are two types of personal pronouns (лични местоимения): long (stressed, free) and short (unstressed, clitic). The long ones are used with both verbs and prepositions (only the direct object forms), whereas the short ones only with verbs. In some special cases the long and the short forms of the object pronouns can be used together. As in English, personal pronouns change depending on their function within the sentence. In Bulgarian, personal pronouns change according to whether it is:

- subject, or nominative case (именителен падеж). Since number and person are marked on Bulgarian verbs, the subject pronouns are used only for emphasis or to resolve ambiguity.
- direct object, or accusative case (винителен падеж). Direct object pronouns come in both long and short sets.
- indirect object, or dative case (дателен падеж). Indirect object pronouns come in both long and short sets.
- object of a preposition. Only one set of pronouns (long).

Personal pronouns
Number	Person		subject (nominative case)	direct object (accusative case)		indirect object (dative case)			with preposition
Number	Person		subject (nominative case)	long	short	long (obsolete)†	long (prepositional accusative case)	short	with preposition
Singular	First		аз	мене / мен	ме	мене	на мене / на мен	ми	с мене / с мен
Singular	Second		ти	тебе / теб	те	тебе	на тебе / на теб	ти	с тебе / с теб
Singular	Third	Masculine	той	него	го	нему	на него	му	с него
Singular	Third	Feminine	тя	нея	я	ней	на нея	ѝ*	с нея
Singular	Third	Neuter	то	него	го	нему	на него	му	с него
Plural	First		ние	нас	ни	нам	на нас	ни	с нас
Plural	Second		вие	вас	ви	вам	на вас	ви	с вас
Plural	Third		те	тях	ги	тям	на тях	им	с тях

†This set of long forms is obsolete and is nowadays replaced by на + long direct object pronouns: на мен/на мене, на теб/на тебе, на него, на нея, на него, на нас, на вас, на тях.

*Although ѝ is always unstressed, a stress mark is written over it to distinguish it from и "and".

Note that the short indirect object forms can also be used to indicate possession (see table of possessive pronouns below).

== Reflexive pronouns ==
There are two kinds of reflexive pronouns (възвратни местоимения): personal and possessive. Both have two forms: long (stressed, free) and short (unstressed, clitic). Reflexive pronouns do not decline for grammatical person. Personal reflexive pronouns have direct object (accusative) and indirect object (dative) forms. Possessive reflexive pronouns agree in gender, number and definiteness only with the owned noun, not with the possessor. They are used when the subject of the verb owns the object. For example: "Аз виждам своя брат" (I see my brother).

Personal reflexive pronouns
direct object (accusative case)		indirect object (dative case)		with preposition
long	Short	long	Short	with preposition
себе си	се	на себе си	си	за cебе си

== Possessive pronouns ==
There are two types of possessive pronouns: long (stressed, free) and short (unstressed, clitic). The long pronouns agree in gender and number with the modified noun and usually precede it, the short forms are invariable and follow the noun ("мъжът ми").

The long forms can be definite or indefinite (for example "моя раница" means "my rucksack (but I have several)" while "моята раница" means "the only rucksack of mine" or "the rucksack of mine of which we have already spoken (but I could have other ones, too)" ), depending on whether the noun they modify is definite or indefinite, but only the first constituent of the definite noun phrase is used with an article ("моят мъж" or rarely "мъжът мой"). Both long and short forms can be used attributively, meanwhile only long forms can be used predicatively.

Possessive pronouns
Number	Person		Masculine		Feminine		Neuter		Plural		Short
Number	Person		indefinite	definite	indefinite	definite	indefinite	definite	indefinite	definite	Short
Singular	First		мой	моят/моя	моя	моята	мое	моето	мои	моите	ми
Singular	Second		твой	твоят/твоя	твоя	твоята	твое	твоето	твои	твоите	ти
Singular	Third	Masculine	негов	неговият/неговия	негова	неговата	негово	неговото	негови	неговите	му
Singular	Third	Feminine	неин	нейният/нейния	нейна	нейната	нейно	нейното	нейни	нейните	ѝ*
Singular	Third	Neuter	негов	неговият/неговия	негова	неговата	негово	неговото	негови	неговите	му
Plural	First		наш	нашият/нашия	наша	нашата	наше	нашето	наши	нашите	ни
Plural	Second		ваш	вашият/вашия	ваша	вашата	ваше	вашето	ваши	вашите	ви
Plural	Third		техен	техният/техния	тяхна	тяхната	тяхно	тяхното	техни	техните	им

*Although ѝ is always unstressed, a stress mark is written over it to distinguish it from и "and".

=== Possessive reflexive pronouns ===
Possessive reflexive pronouns
long								Short
Masculine		Feminine		Neuter		Plural		Short
Indefinite	Definite	Indefinite	Definite	Indefinite	Definite	Indefinite	Definite	Short
свой	своят/своя	своя	своята	свое	своето	свои	своите	си

== Demonstrative pronouns ==
Demonstrative pronouns (показателни местоимения) agree in number and gender with the noun they refer to (except for this for quantity). There are three types of demonstrative pronouns: for persons and objects, for quality and for quantity. Each demonstrative can not only modify a noun, but also be used on its own. Personal demonstrative pronouns have two forms: for nouns that are close to the speaker or writer and for far nouns. Quality pronouns also have two forms: positive, that specifies that the noun has a particular quality (this kind of/this sort of/of that type) and negative, that specifies that the noun doesn't have a particular quality or has a different one (not this kind of/not this sort of/not of that type).

Demonstrative pronouns
Gender/ Number	Personal		For quality		For quantity
Gender/ Number	proximal (this)	distal (that)	positive	negative	For quantity
Masculine	този/тоя	онзи/оня	такъв	онакъв/инакъв	толкова
Feminine	тази/тая	онази/оная	такава	онакава/инакава	толкова
Neuter	това/туй	онова/онуй	такова	онакова/инакова	толкова
Plural	тези/тия	онези/ония	такива	онакива/инакива	толкова

The demonstrative pronoun for quantity толкова is used with nouns and adjectives. It both specifies the exact quantity of something – this many/this much, and indicates the large extent or degree of something – so (many/much).

== Universal pronouns ==
There are three types of universal pronouns (обобщителни местоимения): personal, for quality and for quantity. They all agree in gender and number with the noun they modify. Personal universal pronouns are used with both singular and plural nouns or on their own and mean all the things or people belonging to a group of one or more – each/every(body). Quality universal nouns are used for specifying that the noun they refer to possesses all kinds of qualities – all kinds/sorts/types of. Quantity universal pronouns are always definite (except for the plural and the neuter form which can also be indefinite, when they are not used with a noun but on their own) and mean the whole number/amount of something – all (the). The indefinite neuter form also means everything.

The universal pronouns for quantity are rarely used in singular. The adjective цял (whole) is used with a definite article instead: целият/целия, цялата, цялото (but целите in plural does not have this meaning).

Universal pronouns
Gender/ Number	Personal	For quality	For quantity
Masculine	всеки (всякой)*	всякакъв	всичкият/всичкия
Feminine	всяка (всякоя)	всякаква	всичката
Neuter	всяко (всякое)	всякакво	всичко(то)
Plural	всички (всякои)	всякакви	всички(те)

*всеки (всякой): when it refers to a person and is used without a noun, it has an object form всекиго (всякого); however, всекиго (всякого) are falling out of use and are increasingly often replaced with всеки (всякой), especially in colloquial speech. For more information, see Bulgarian grammar # Remnants of grammatical cases.

== Interrogative pronouns ==
Interrogative pronouns (въпросителни местоимения) refer to an unknown person, object, quality or quantity and agree with the noun they denote in gender and number. Personal interrogative pronouns are also used with nonhuman beings (animals and objects). Quality interrogative pronouns are used for asking one to specify the word in question. They are translated in English as what/what kind of/what sort of. There is only one interrogative pronoun for quantity—колко—and it doesn't have any gender or number forms. It is used before plural nouns to ask about their quantity (then it is translated as how much/how many), and before an adjective or adverb to ask about the extent, degree, age, etc. of something or somebody (translated as how).

Interrogative pronouns
Gender/ Number	Personal (who / whom)	Possessive (whose)	For quality (what / what kind of...)	For quantity (how many / how much)
Masculine	кой*	чий	какъв	колко
Feminine	коя	чия	каква	колко
Neuter	кое	чие	какво	колко
Plural	кои	чии	какви	колко

*кой: when it refers to a person and is used without a noun, it also has an object form кого; however, кого is falling out of use and is increasingly often replaced with кой, especially in colloquial speech. For more information, see Bulgarian grammar # Remnants of grammatical cases.

== Relative pronouns ==
The relative pronouns (относителни местоимения) are formed from the corresponding interrogative pronouns by adding -то to the end of the word. They are used for introducing a relative clause.

Relative pronouns
Gender/ Number	Personal	Possessive	For quality	For quantity
Masculine	който*	чийто	какъвто	колкото
Feminine	която	чиято	каквато	колкото
Neuter	което	чието	каквото	колкото
Plural	които	чиито	каквито	колкото

*който: when it refers to a person and is used without a noun, it also has an object form когото; however, когото is falling out of use and is increasingly often replaced with който, especially in colloquial speech. For more information, see Bulgarian grammar # Remnants of grammatical cases.

== Negative pronouns ==
There are three kinds of negative pronouns (отрицателни местоимения): personal (no(body)/none), for quality (no/none/no kind of/no type of) and for quantity (none/not any). Unlike in English, in Bulgarian the word for nothing is not only a negative pronoun – нищо, but also a neuter noun (nothingness); as a noun it can have a definite article – нищото (the nothingness).

Negative pronouns
Gender/ Number	Personal	Possessive	For quality	For quantity
Masculine	никой*	ничий	никакъв	николко
Feminine	никоя	ничия	никаква	николко
Neuter	никое	ничие	никакво	николко
Plural	никои	ничии	никакви	николко

*никой: when it refers to a person and is used without a noun, it also has an object form никого.

== Indefinite pronouns ==
There are three types of indefinite pronouns (неопределителни местоимения): personal (some(one)), for quality (some (kind of)) and for quantity. (several/a few/some). Unlike in English, in Bulgarian the word for something is not only an indefinite pronoun – нещо, but also a neuter noun (a thing); as a noun it can have a definite article – нещото (the thing).

Indefinite pronouns
Gender/ Number	Personal	Possessive	For quality	For quantity
Masculine	някой*	нечий	някакъв	няколко
Feminine	някоя	нечия	някаква	няколко
Neuter	някое	нечие	някакво	няколко
Plural	някои	нечии	някакви	няколко

*някой: when it refers to a person and is used without a noun, it also has an object form някого; however, някого is falling out of use and is increasingly often replaced with някой, especially in colloquial speech. For more information, see Bulgarian grammar # Remnants of grammatical cases.

== Formal second person ==
Pronouns for formal second person are always in plural, capitalized: Вие, Вас, Ваш, Ви, etc.
