= Pronouns in Macedonian =

Words in Macedonian that substitute for a noun or noun phrase

A pronoun (Macedonian: заменка) is a substitute for a noun or a noun phrase, or things previously mentioned or understood from the context. These are words like јас 'I', мене 'me', себе 'himself, herself', ова 'this', кој 'who, which', некој 'somebody', никој 'nobody', сите 'all', секој 'everybody'.

Macedonian pronouns decline for case ('падеж'), i.e., their function in a phrase as subject (ex. јас 'I'), direct object (него 'him'), or object of a preposition (од неа 'from her').

Based on their meaning and the function in the sentence, pronouns fall into the following categories:

Types of pronouns	Examples
Demonstrative pronouns	ова (this), тоа (that), овде (here), таму (there)
Indefinite pronouns	некој (somebody), нешто (something)
Interrogative pronouns	кој (who), кого/кому (whom), што (what)
Personal pronouns	јас (I), ти (you), тој (he), таа (she), тоа (it), ние (we)
Possessive pronouns	мој (my), твој (your), нејзин (her), негов (his), наш (our)
Relative pronouns	кој (which), што (that), чиј (whose)
Reflexive pronoun and reciprocal pronouns	себе (himself, herself), се (self)
Universal pronouns	сите (all), секој (everybody, each), сешто (everything), секаде (everywhere)

== Formal and informal "you" pronouns ==
Use of ти (second-person singular informal) is generally limited to friends and family, and is used among children. In formal usage only Вие (second-person singular formal) occurs; ти may be used among peers in a workplace, but it is rare in official documents. Вие should always be capitalized when used in this way as a sign of respect. Ти, used when referring to God, should also be capitalized.

== Personal pronouns ==
Personal pronouns
Number	Person		Subject Nominative	Direct Complement Accusative		Indirect Complement		
Number	Person		Subject Nominative	Direct Complement Accusative		no preposition Dative		preposition
Number	Person		Subject Nominative	full	short	full	short possessive	preposition
Singular	First		јас	мене	ме	мене	ми	мене
Singular	Second		ти	тебе	те	тебе	ти	тебе
Singular	Third	Masculine	тој	него	го	нему	му	него
Singular	Third	Feminine	таа	неа	ја	нејзе	ѝ	неа
Singular	Third	Neuter	тоа	него	го	нему	му	него
Plural	First		ние	нас	нѐ	нам	ни	нас
Plural	Second		вие	вас	ве	вам	ви	вас
Plural	Third		тие	нив	ги	ним	им	нив

== Possessive pronouns ==
Possessive pronouns
Number	Person		Masculine		Feminine		Neuter		Plural		Short form
Number	Person		indefinite	definite	indefinite	definite	indefinite	definite	indefinite	definite	Short form
Singular	First		мој	мојот	моја	мојата	мое	моето	мои	моите	ми
Singular	Second		твој	твојот	твоја	твојата	твое	твоето	твои	твоите	ти
Singular	Third	Masculine	негов	неговиот	негова	неговата	негово	неговото	негови	неговите	му
Singular	Third	Feminine	нејзин	нејзиниот	нејзина	нејзината	нејзино	нејзиното	нејзини	нејзините	ѝ
Singular	Third	Neuter	негов	неговиот	негова	неговата	негово	неговото	негови	неговите	му
Plural	First		наш	нашиот	наша	нашата	наше	нашето	наши	нашите	ни
Plural	Second		ваш	вашиот	ваша	вашата	ваше	вашето	ваши	вашите	ви
Plural	Third		нивен/нивни	нивниот	нивна	нивната	нивно	нивното	нивни	нивните	им

== Interrogative pronouns ==
Interrogative pronouns (прашални заменки) refer to an unknown person, object, quality or quantity and agree with the noun they denote in gender and number. Personal interrogative pronouns have two cases, nominative and genitive. There are also accusative and dative forms: кого and кому, respectively. The more analytical construction на кого is an optional alternative for the dative form. They are also used with nonhuman beings (animals and objects). Quality interrogative pronouns are used for asking one to specify the word in question. They are translated in English as what/what kind of/what sort of.

Interrogative pronouns
Gender	Personal				For quality
Gender	Nominative	Accusative	Dative	Genitive	For quality
Masculine	кој (who)	кого (whom)	кому (на кого) (to whom)	чиј (whose)	каков
Feminine	која	кого	кому (на кого)	чија	каква
Neuter	кое	кого	кому (на кого)	чие	какво
Plural (all genders)	кои	кого	кому (на кого)	чии	какви

There is only one interrogative pronoun for quantity — колку and it is invariant for gender and number. It is used before plural nouns to ask about their quantity (then it is translated as how much/how many), and before an adjective or adverb to ask about the extent, degree, age, etc., of something or somebody (translated as how).

== Demonstrative pronominal adjectives ==
	this (close to speaker)	the (close to listener)	that (far from both)
Masculine	овој	тој	оној
Feminine	оваа	таа	онаа
Neuter	ова	тоа	она
Plural	овие	тие	оние

== Reflexive pronouns ==
Accusative		Dative	
Full	Short	Full	Short
себе	се	себе	си

An alternative full form, себеси, is used for emphasis.

Possessive reflexive pronouns
Full								Short
Masculine		Feminine		Neuter		Plural (all genders)		Short
Indefinite	Definite	Indefinite	Definite	Indefinite	Definite	Indefinite	Definite	Short
свој	својот	своја	својата	свое	своето	свои	своите	си

- Ана ѝ ја даде нејзината книга на Марија. (Ana gave her [Maria's] book to Maria.)
- Ана ѝ ја даде својата книга на Марија. (Ana gave her [Ana's] book to Maria.)

== Summative pronouns ==
Summative pronouns
Type	Masculine	Feminine	Neuter	Plural (all genders)
Personal	секој	секоја	секое	секои / сите
For quality	секаков	секаква	секакво	секакви
For quantity	сиот	сета	сето	сите

== Negative pronouns ==
Negative pronouns
Gender	Personal		For quality	For quantity
Gender	Nominative	Genitive	For quality	For quantity
Masculine	никој	ничиј	никаков	николку
Feminine	никоја	ничија	никаква	николку
Neuter	никое	ничие	никакво	николку
Plural (all genders)	никои	ничии	никакви	николку

== Indefinite pronouns ==
Indefinite pronouns
Gender	Personal		For quality	For quantity
Gender	Nominative	Genitive	For quality	For quantity
Masculine	некој	нечиј	некаков	неколку
Feminine	некоја	нечија	некаква	неколку
Neuter	некое	нечие	некакво	неколку
Plural (all genders)	некои	нечии	некакви	неколку

== Relative pronouns ==
Relative pronouns
Gender	Personal	
Gender	Nominative	Genitive
Masculine	којшто	чијшто
Feminine	којашто	чијашто
Neuter	коешто	чиешто
Plural (all genders)	коишто	чиишто
