= Bulgarian grammar =

Grammatical rules of the Bulgarian language

Front page of the 1835 Bulgarian Grammar by Neofit Rilski, the first such grammar published.

Bulgarian grammar is the grammar of the Bulgarian language. Bulgarian is a South Slavic language that evolved from Old Church Slavonic—the written norm for the Slavic languages in the Middle Ages which derived from Proto-Slavic. Bulgarian is also a part of the Balkan sprachbund, which also includes Greek, Macedonian, Romanian, Albanian and the Torlakian dialect of Serbian. It shares with them several grammatical innovations that set it apart from most other Slavic languages, even other South Slavic languages. Among these are a sharp reduction in noun inflections—Bulgarian has lost the noun cases but has developed a definite article, which is suffixed at the end of words. In its verbal system, Bulgarian is set apart from most Slavic languages by the loss of the infinitive, the preservation of most of the complexities of the older conjugation system (including the opposition between aorist and imperfect) and the development of a complex evidential system to distinguish between witnessed and several kinds of non-witnessed information.

== Nouns ==
Bulgarian nouns have the categories grammatical gender, number (including count form), definiteness and vocative form.

=== Gender ===
A noun has one of three specific grammatical genders (masculine, feminine, neuter).

=== Number ===
A noun has two numbers (singular and plural), plus a numerical plural form. The plural is formed by adding to or replacing the singular ending, most commonly in the following ways:

	sing.	plur.
masc.	-conson.	+и +ове (monosyl.)
fem.	-а / -я	-и
neut.	-о -е	-а +та

With cardinal numbers and some adverbs, masculine nouns use a separate numerical plural form бройна множествена форма (broyna mnozhestvena forma). It is a vestige of the grammatical dual number, which disappeared from the language in the Middle Ages. The numerical form is used in the masculine whenever there is a precise amount of something, regardless of the actual number, e.g. –

sg. стол (stol 'chair') →
general plural много столове (mnogo stolove 'many chairs') →
numerical plural два стола / десет стола (dva stola / deset stola 'two chairs / ten chairs'). (Note: See Bulgarian nouns#Count form for more details.)

=== Definiteness ===
Definiteness is expressed by a definite article which is postfixed to the noun:

	masc.	fem.	neut.
sing.	-ът / -ят (subject) -a / -я (object)	-та	-то
plur.	-те		-та after а/я or -те after и/е

The definite article comes after plural ending:

стол [stol]^{(chair)}	столът [stolat] (subject) стола [stola] (object)^{(the chair)}
столове [stolove]^{(chairs)}	столовете [stolovete]^{(the chairs)}

маса [masa]^{(table)}	масата [masata]^{(the table)}
маси [masi]^{(tables)}	масите [masite]^{(the tables)}

копче [kopche]^{(button)}	копчето [kopcheto]^{(the button)}
копчета [kopcheta]^{(buttons)}	копчетата [kopchetata]^{(the buttons)}

=== Vocative form ===
Vocative form is used for a noun that identifies a person (animal, object, etc.) being addressed.

- for family members – e.g. майка → майко (majka → majko 'mother')
- for masculine names – e.g. Петър → Петре (Petar → Petre)
- in social descriptors – e.g. приятел → приятелю (prijatel → prijatelju 'friend'), учител → учителю (učitel → učitelju 'teacher')

From the first decades of the 20th century, there is a tendency to avoid vocative forms. This is true for many personal names, as the use of feminine name forms in -[ь/й]o and of the potential vocative forms of foreign names has come to be considered rude or rustic. Thus, Любомире means 'hey, Lyubomir', while the corresponding feminine forms Елено ('hey, Elena'), Маргарито ('hey, Margarita') are today seen as rude or unceremonious, and declining foreign names as in *Джоне ('hey, John') or *Саймъне ('hey, Simon') is considered humorous.

The tendency to avoid vocative forms for foreign names does not apply to names from Classical Antiquity, with the source languages having the vocative case as well: cf. Цезаре' ('O Caesar'), Перикле ('O Pericles'), Зевсе ('O Zeus'), etc.

Vocative is still in full and regular use for general nouns such as господине (gospodine 'mister'), госпожице (gospožice 'miss'), госпожо (gospožo 'Mrs'), бабо (babo 'grandma'), майко (majko 'mother'), сине (sine 'son'). (Note: See Bulgarian nouns#Usage for more usage notes)

=== Remnants of grammatical cases ===
Old Bulgarian had an extensive system of declension which included seven grammatical cases: nominative, accusative, dative, genitive, locative, instrumental and vocative; of these, only what used to be nominative and vocative cases survive in modern Bulgarian. Though Bulgarian has lost its old declensional system, pronouns still have grammatical case; also, some nouns in indirect cases became fossilized and were reanalyzed as other parts of speech.

==== Remnants of grammatical cases in pronouns ====
Personal pronouns still have different subject, direct object and indirect object forms.

Personal pronouns
Number	Person		subject (nominative case)	direct object (accusative case)		indirect object (dative case)			with preposition
Number	Person		subject (nominative case)	long	short	long, obsolete	long	short	with preposition
Singular	First		аз	мене / мен	ме	мене	на мене / на мен	ми	с мене / с мен
Singular	Second		ти	тебе / теб	те	тебе	на тебе / на теб	ти	с тебе / с теб
Singular	Third	Masculine	той	него	го	нему	на него	му	с него
Singular	Third	Feminine	тя	нея	я	ней	на нея	ѝ*	с нея
Singular	Third	Neuter	то	него	го	нему	на него	му	с него
Plural	First		ние	нас	ни	нам	на нас	ни	с нас
Plural	Second		вие	вас	ви	вам	на вас	ви	с вас
Plural	Third		те	тях	ги	тям	на тях	им	с тях

The set of pronouns in italic is obsolete and is nowadays substituted by на + long direct object pronouns: на мен/на мене, на теб/на тебе, на него, на нея, на него, на нас, на вас, на тях. (Note: See Bulgarian pronouns#Personal pronouns for more details.)

Interrogative, indefinite, negative, relative and universal pronouns have different subject and object forms, but only if some conditions are met:

- they are different only for masculine singular pronouns;
- only if pronoun refers to a male human being: e.g. човекът, с когото говоря /tʃoˈvɛkɐt, s koˈɡɔto ɡoˈvɔrjɐ/ 'the man that I'm talking to'; note that когото can be replaced with който in spoken language; but, e.g. столът, на който седя /ˈstɔɫɐt, nɐ ˈkɔjto sɛˈdjɐ/ 'the chair that I'm sitting on'.
- only if the pronoun is used alone, not attributively.

Otherwise, the subject and object pronouns are the same. The complete declension is summed up in the table below:

masculine singular pronouns
pronoun type	subject (nominative case)	direct object (accusative case)	direct object (accusative case)*	indirect object (dative case)	indirect object (dative case)*	indirect object (dative case), obsolete
interrogative	кой	кой	кого	на кой	на кого	кому
indefinite	някой	някой	някого	на някой	на някого	някому
negative	никой	никой	никого	на никой	на никого	никому
relative	който	който	когото	на който	на когото	комуто
universal	всеки	всеки	всекиго	на всеки	на всекиго	всекиму

*These sets of pronouns are falling out of use, especially in spoken language. Instead of object forms, the subject ones tend to be used in more instances, e.g. на кой is used instead of на кого and кой instead of кого and so on.

Single-word indirect object pronouns are obsolete.

==== Definite article ====
The grammarians who standardised the Bulgarian literary language introduced the subject definite article (пълен член) -ът/-ят and the object definite article (кратък член) -a/-я. Both of these forms existed in Bulgarian dialects of the time, but they were regional rather than grammatical variants. Their redistribution to express case distinctions was entirely artificial. The subject definite article is used with definite masculine singular nouns which are the subject of a sentence, otherwise the object definite article is used. For example:

стол (stol 'a chair') →
столът (stolat 'the chair', subject) →
под стола (pod stola 'under the chair', object).

==== Formerly inflected nouns as other parts of speech ====
===== Remnants of the accusative case =====
Adverbs: сутрин, вечер, зимъс, днес, нощес, есенес, пролетес, лятос, вред.

===== Remnants of the dative case =====
Adverbs and prepositions:

Personal pronouns:

masc

на него/му ('to him', long and short form), ! никому (remnant, = на никого 'to nobody')

fem

на нея/ѝ ('to her', long and short form);  ѝ not to be confused with й

neuter

на него/му ('to it', long and short form)

===== Remnants of the genitive case =====
Adverbs: снощи, отстрани, довечера, отръки, допъти.

===== Remnants of the instrumental case =====
Adverbs and prepositions: нощем (noštem 'during the night', from нощ (nošt 'night')); сбогом (sbogom 'farewell' lit. 'with God', from с + бог s + bog); бегом (begom 'while running' from бяг (byag 'running')), посредством, пешком, пълзешком, силом, денем, кръгом, гърбом, редом, тихом, мигом, ребром, цифром, числом, словом.

===== Remnants of the locative case =====
Adverbs and prepositions: горе, отгоре, долу, отдолу, зиме, лете, утре, вкратце, есени, пролети, върху, срещу, между.

== Adjectives ==
A Bulgarian adjective agrees in gender, number and definiteness with the noun it is appended to and is usually put before it. The comparative and the superlative form are formed with the (hyphenated) prefixes по- and най- respectively.

== Pronouns ==
Nicolova distinguishes the following types of Bulgarian pronouns:

- personal
- reflexive
- possessive
- reflexive possessive
- demonstrative
- universal
- interrogative
- relative
- negative
- indefinite.

== Word order ==
Although Bulgarian has almost no noun cases its word order is rather free. It is even freer than the word order of some languages that have cases, for example German. This is due to the agreement between the subject and the verb of a sentence. So in Bulgarian the sentence "I saw Lyubomir" can be expressed thus:

Видях Любомир.
  saw-1pSg Lyubomir
  
Любомир (го) видях.
  Lyubomir (him) saw-1pSg

It is clear that the subject is аз 'I' (it has been dropped), because the verb видях is in the first person singular.

Other examples – "Lyubomir greeted the girls":

Любомир поздрави момичетата.
  Lyubomir greeted-3pSg girls-the.
Момичетата (ги) поздрави Любомир.
  Girls-the (them) greeted-3pSg Lyubomir.
Любомир момичетата поздрави.
  Lyubomir girls-the greeted-3pSg.
Момичетата Любомир (ги) поздрави.
  Girls-the Lyubomir (them) greeted-3pSg.
Поздрави Любомир момичетата.
  Greeted-3pSg Lyubomir girls-the.
Поздрави (ги) момичетата Любомир.
  Greeted-3pSg (them) girls-the Lyubomir.

Theoretically all permutations are possible but the last one sounds rather odd.

"The girls greeted Lyubomir":

Момичетата поздравиха Любомир.
  Girls-the greeted-3pPl Lyubomir.
Любомир (го) поздравиха момичетата.
  Lyubomir (him) greeted-3pPl girls-the.
Момичетата Любомир поздравиха.
  Girls-the Lyubomir greeted-3pPl.
Любомир момичетата (го) поздравиха.
  Lyubomir girls-the (him) greeted-3pPl.
Поздравиха момичетата Любомир.
  Greeted-3pPl girls-the Lyubomir.
Поздравиха (го) Любомир момичетата.
  Greeted-3pPl (him) Lyubomir girls-the.

The clitic doubling (го/ги) is obligatory only when the subject and the object are both in third person, and they are either both singular or both plural, but when the meaning is clear from the context it can be omitted. Examples:

Любомир го поздрави Мария. 
  Lyubomir him greeted-3pSg Maria.
  Maria greeted Lyubomir.
Мария я поздрави Любомир. 
  Maria her greeted-3pSg Lyubomir.
  Lyubomir greeted Maria.

but

Ролите озвучиха артистите... 
  Roles-the sound-screened-3pPl artists-the...
  The artists...(their names) sound-screened the roles. (They made the soundtrack for the film.)

In the compound tenses, when a participle is used, and when the subject and the object are of different gender or number, the clitic doubling can also be left out. So the first two of the above examples can be expressed in a compound tense thus:

Любомир (го) е поздравила Мария.
  Lyubomir (him) has greeted-3pSgFem Maria.
  Maria has greeted Lyubomir.
Мария (я) е поздравил Любомир.
  Maria (her) has greeted-3pSgMasc Lyubomir.
  Lyubomir has greeted Maria.

The above two examples sound a bit odd without the doubling, unless it is a case of topicalization and special stress is put on the first word.

== Syntax ==
Bulgarian employs clitic doubling, mostly for emphatic purposes. For example, the following constructions are common in colloquial Bulgarian:

Аз (го) дадох подаръка на Мария.
lit. 'I gave it the present to Maria'

Аз (ѝ го) дадох подаръка на Мария.
lit. 'I gave her it the present to Maria.'

The phenomenon is practically obligatory in the spoken language in the case of inversion signalling information structure (in writing, clitic doubling may be skipped in such instances, with a somewhat bookish effect):

Подаръка (ѝ) го дадох на Мария.
lit. 'The present [to her] it I-gave to Maria.'

На Мария ѝ (го) дадох подаръка.
lit. 'To Maria to her [it] I-gave the present.'

Sometimes, the doubling signals syntactic relations, thus:

Петър и Иван ги изядоха вълците.
lit. 'Petar and Ivan them ate the wolves.'
i.e., 'Petar and Ivan were eaten by the wolves.'

This is contrasted with:

Петър и Иван изядоха вълците.
lit. 'Petar and Ivan ate the wolves'
i.e., 'Petar and Ivan ate the wolves'.

In this case, clitic doubling can be a colloquial alternative to the more formal or bookish passive voice, which would be constructed as follows:

Петър и Иван бяха изядени от вълците.
lit. 'Petar and Ivan were eaten by the wolves.'

Clitic doubling is also fully obligatory, both in the spoken and in the written norm, in clauses including several special expressions that use the short accusative and dative pronouns such as играе ми се 'I feel like playing'; студено ми е 'I am cold'; and боли ме ръката 'my arm hurts':

На мен ми се спи, а на Иван му се играе.
lit. 'To me to me it-feels-like-sleeping, and to Ivan to him it-feels-like-playing'
i.e., 'I feel like sleeping, and Ivan feels like playing.'

На нас ни е студено, а на вас ви е топло.
lit. 'To us to us it-is cold, and to you-plur. to you-plur. it-is warm'
i.e., 'We are cold, and you are warm.'

Иван го боли гърлото, а мене ме боли главата.
lit. 'Ivan him aches the throat, and me me aches the head'
i.e., 'Ivan has sore throat, and I have a headache.'

Except the above examples, clitic doubling is considered inappropriate in a formal context.

=== Other features ===
==== Questions ====
Questions in Bulgarian which do not use a question word (such as who? what? etc.) are formed with the particle ли after the verb; a subject is not necessary, as the verbal conjugation suggests who is performing the action:

- Идваш 'you are coming'
  Идваш ли? 'are you coming?'

While the particle ли generally goes after the verb, it can go after a noun or adjective if a contrast is needed:

- Идваш ли с нас?
  'are you coming with us?''
- С нас ли идваш?
  'are you coming with us?'

A verb is not always necessary, e.g. when presenting a choice:

- Той ли? 'him?'
- Жълтият ли? 'the yellow one?' (Note: The word или ('either') has a similar etymological root: и + ли ('and') – e.g. (или) Жълтият или червеният – '(either) the yellow one or the red one.' ^{wiktionary})

Rhetorical questions can be formed by adding ли to a question word, thus forming a "double interrogative":

- Кой? 'Who?'
- Кой ли?! 'I wonder who(?)'

The same construction +не 'no, not' is an emphasized positive –

Кой беше там? 'Who was there?'
Кой ли не! 'Nearly everyone!' (lit. 'I wonder who wasn't there')

==== Significant verbs ====
===== Съм =====
The verb съм /sɤm/ (Note: съм is pronounced similar to English "sum".) 'to be' is also used as an auxiliary for forming the perfect, the passive and the conditional:

- past tense: /oˈdariɫ sɐm/ 'I have hit'
- passive: /oˈdarɛn sɐm/ 'I am hit'
- past passive: /bʲax oˈdarɛn/ 'I was hit'
- conditional: /bix oˈdaril/ –'I would hit'

Two alternate forms of съм exist:

- бъда /ˈbɤdɐ/

Interchangeable with съм in most tenses and moods, but never in the present indicative. For example:

/ˈiskɐm dɐ ˈbɤdɐ/ 'I want to be'
/ʃtɛ ˈbɤdɐ tuk/ 'I will be here'

In the imperative, only бъда is used:

/bɤˈdi tuk/ 'be here'

- бивам /ˈbivɐm/

Slightly archaic, imperfective form of бъда. For example:

Биваше заплашен. /ˈbivɐʃɛ zaˈplaʃɛn/ 'he used to get threats'

In contemporary usage, it is mostly used in the negative to mean "ought not"; for example:

Не бива да пушиш. /nɛ ˈbivɐ dɐ ˈpuʃiʃ/ 'you shouldn't smoke'. (Note: It is a common reply to the question Kak e? /ˈkak ɛ/ 'How are things?' (lit. 'how is it?') – /ˈbivɐ/ 'alright' (lit. 'it [repetitively] is') or /ˈkak si/ 'How are you?' -/ˈbivɐm/ 'I'm OK'.)

===== Ще =====
The impersonal verb ще (lit. 'it wants') (Note: ще – from the verb ща – 'to want.' The present tense of this verb in the sense of 'to want' is archaic and only used colloquially. Instead, искам /ˈiskɐm/ is used.) is used to form the (positive) future tense:

- отивам /oˈtivɐm/ 'I am going'
- ще отивам /ʃtɛ oˈtivɐm/ 'I will be going'

The negative future is formed with the invariable construction няма да /ˈɲamɐ dɐ/ (see няма below): (Note: Formed from the impersonal verb няма (lit. 'it does not have') and the subjunctive particle да /dɐ/ ('that'))

- няма да отивам /ˈɲamɐ dɐ oˈtivɐm/

'I will not be going'

The past tense of this verb, щях /ʃtʲax/, is conjugated to form the past conditional ('would have' – again, with да, since it is irrealis):

- щях да отида /ʃtʲax dɐ oˈtidɐ/

'I would have gone'

- щеше да отидеш /ʃtɛʃɛ da otidɛʃ/

'you would have gone'

===== Имам and нямам =====
The verbs имам (/ˈimɐm/ 'to have') and нямам (/ˈɲamɐm/ 'to not have'):

- the third person singular of these two can be used impersonally to mean 'there is/there are' or 'there isn't/aren't any,' (Note: They can also be used on their own as a reply, with no object following: има – 'there are some'; /ˈɲamɐ/ – 'there aren't any' – compare German keine.) e.g.
  - Има време
    /imɐ ˈvrɛmɛ/
    'there is still time'
    compare Spanish hay
  - Няма никого.
    /ˈɲamɐ ˈnikoɡo/
    'there is no one there'.
- The impersonal form няма is used in the negative future (see ще above).
  - няма used on its own can mean simply 'I won't' – a simple refusal to a suggestion or instruction.

==== Conjunctions and particles ====
===== But =====
In Bulgarian, there are several conjunctions all translating into English as "but", which are all used in distinct situations. They are но (no), ама (amà), а (a), ами (amì), and ала (alà) (and обаче (obache 'however') identical in use to но).

While there is some overlapping between their uses, in many cases they are specific. For example, ami is used for a choice: Не това, ами това (ne tova, ami onova 'not this one, but that one') (compare Spanish sino). In contrast, ама (ama) is often used to provide extra information or an opinion: Казах го, ама сгреших (kazah go, ama sgreshih 'I said it, but I was wrong'). Meanwhile, а (a) provides contrast between two situations, and in some sentences can be translated as "although", "while" or "and": Аз работя, а той блее (az rabotya, a toy blee 'I'm working, and he's daydreaming').

Very often, different words can be used to alter the emphasis of a sentence: for example, while pusha, no ne tryabva and pusha, a ne tryabva both mean 'I smoke, but I shouldn't', the first sounds more like a statement of fact ("...but I mustn't"), while the second feels more like a judgement ("...but I oughtn't"). Similarly, az ne iskam, ama toy iska and az ne iskam, a toy iska both mean "I don't want to, but he does", however the first emphasizes the fact that he wants to, while the second emphasizes the wanting rather than the person.

Ala is interesting in that, while it feels archaic, it is often used in poetry and frequently in children's stories, since it has quite a moral/ominous feel to it.

Some common expressions use these words, and some can be used alone as interjections:

- da, ama ne lit. 'yes, but no' i.e., 'you're wrong to think so'
- ama can be tagged onto a sentence to express surprise: ama toy spi! 'he's sleeping!'
- ами! 'you don't say!' or 'really!'

===== Vocative particles =====
Bulgarian has several abstract particles which are used to strengthen a statement. These have no precise translation in English. (Note: Perhaps most similar in use is the tag "man", but the Bulgarian particles are more abstract still.) The particles are strictly informal and can even be considered rude by some people and in some situations. They are mostly used at the end of questions or instructions.

- бе (be) – the most common particle. It can be used to strengthen a statement or, sometimes, to indicate derision of an opinion, aided by the tone of voice. (Originally purely masculine, it can now be used towards both men and women.)
  - kazhi mi, be 'tell me' (insistence)
  - taka li, be? 'is that so?' (derisive)
  - vyarno li, be? 'you don't say!'
- де (de) – expresses urgency, sometimes pleading.
  - stavay, de! 'come on, get up!'
- ма (ma) (feminine only) – originally simply the feminine counterpart of be, but today perceived as rude and derisive (compare the similar evolution of the vocative forms of feminine names).
- бре (bre, masculine), мари (mari, feminine) – similar to be and ma, but archaic. Although informal, can sometimes be heard being used by older people.

===== Modal particles =====
These are "tagged" on to the beginning or end of a sentence to express the mood of the speaker in relation to the situation. They are mostly interrogative or slightly imperative in nature. There is no change in the grammatical mood when these are used (although they may be expressed through different grammatical moods in other languages).

- нали (nalì) – is a universal affirmative tag, like "isn't it"/"won't you", etc. (It is invariable, like the French n'est-ce pas?). It can be placed almost anywhere in the sentence, and does not always require a verb:
  - shte doydesh, nali? 'you are coming, aren't you?'
  - nali iskaha? 'didn't they want to?'
  - nali onzi? 'that one, right?'
- it can express quite complex thoughts through simple constructions:
  - nali nyamashe?
    'I thought you weren't going to!' or
    'I thought there weren't any!'
    (depending on context – the verb nyama presents general negation/lacking; see "nyama" above).
- дали (dalì) – expresses uncertainty (if in the middle of a clause, can be translated as "whether"). For example:

dali shte doyde? 'do you think he will come?'

- нима (nimà) – presents disbelief as does English "don't tell me that ...." For example:

nima iskash?! 'don't tell me you want to!'

It is slightly archaic, but still in use. Can be used on its own as an interjection: nima!

- дано (danò) – expresses hope:
  - shte doyde 'he will come'
  - dano doyde 'I hope he comes'

(compare Spanish ojalá). Grammatically, dano is entirely separate from the verb nadyavam se 'to hope'.

- нека (nèka) – means "let('s)"; for example: neka doyde 'let him come'. When used in the first person, it expresses extreme politeness: neka da otidem... 'let us go' (in colloquial situations, hayde, below, is used instead).

As an interjection, neka can also be used to express judgement or even schadenfreude: neka mu! 'he deserves it!'

===== Intentional particles =====
These express intent or desire, perhaps even pleading. They can be seen as a sort of cohortative side to the language. (Since they can be used by themselves, they could even be considered as verbs in their own right.) They are also highly informal.

- хайде (hàide) 'come on', 'let's'

e.g., hayde, po-barzo 'faster!'

- я (ya) – 'let me' – exclusively when asking someone else for something. It can even be used on its own as a request or instruction (depending on the tone used), indicating that the speaker wants to partake in or try whatever the listener is doing.
  - ya da vidya – let me see; ya? or ya! – "let me.../give me..."
- недей (nedèi) (plural nedèyte) – can be used to issue a negative instruction. For example: nedey da idvash 'don't come' (nedey + subjunctive). In some dialects, the construction nedey idva (nedey + preterite) is used instead. As an interjection – nedei! 'don't!' (See section on imperative mood).

These particles can be combined with the vocative particles for greater effect, e.g., ya da vidya, be ('let me see'), or even exclusively in combinations with them, with no other elements, e.g., hayde, de! ('come on!'); nedey, de! ('I told you not to!').

==== Pronouns of quality ====
Bulgarian has several pronouns of quality which have no direct parallels in English: kakav 'what sort of'; takuv 'this sort of'; onakuv 'that sort of' (colloq.); nyakakav 'some sort of'; nikakav 'no sort of'; vsyakakav 'every sort of'; and the relative pronoun kakavto 'the sort of ... that ... '. The adjective ednakuv 'the same' derives from the same radical. (Note: Like the demonstratives, these take the same form as pronouns as they do as adjectives – ie. takuv means both "this kind of ..." (adj.) and this kind of person/thing (pron., depending on the context).)

Examples:

- kakav chovek?! 'what person?! '; kakav chovek e toy? 'what sort of person is he?'
- ne poznavam takuv 'I don't know any (people like that)' lit. 'I don't know this sort of (person)'
- nyakakvi hora lit. 'some type of people', but the understood meaning is 'a bunch of people I don't know'
- vsyakakvi hora 'all sorts of people'
- kakav iskash? 'which type do you want?'

nikakav! 'I don't want any!/none!'

An interesting phenomenon is that these can be strung along one after another in quite long constructions, e.g.

word	literal meaning	sentence	meaning of sentence as a whole
–	–	edna kola	a car
takava	this sort of	edna takava kola ...	this car (that I'm trying to describe)
nikakva	no sort of	edna takava nikakva kola	this worthless car (that I'm trying to describe)
nyakakva	some sort of	edna takava nyakakva nikakva kola	this sort of worthless car (that I'm trying to describe)

An extreme, albeit colloquial, example with almost no intrinsic lexical meaning – yet which is meaningful to the Bulgarian ear – would be:

kakva e taya takava edna nyakakva nikakva?!
inferred translation: 'what kind of no-good person is she?'
literal translation: 'what kind of – is – this one here (she) – this sort of – one – some sort of – no sort of'

Note: the subject of the sentence is simply the pronoun taya lit. 'this one here', colloq. 'she'.

Another interesting phenomenon that is observed in colloquial speech is the use of takova (neuter of takyv) not only as a substitute for an adjective, but also as a substitute for a verb. In that case the base form takova is used as the third person singular in the present indicative and all other forms are formed by analogy to other verbs in the language. Sometimes the "verb" may even acquire a derivational prefix that changes its meaning. Examples:

- takovah ti shapkata 'I did something to your hat' (perhaps: 'I took your hat')
- takovah si ochilata 'I did something to my glasses' (perhaps: 'I lost my glasses')
- takovah se 'I did something to myself' (perhaps: 'I hurt myself')

Another use of takova in colloquial speech is the word takovata, which can be used as a substitution for a noun, but also, if the speaker doesn't remember or is not sure how to say something, they might say takovata and then pause to think about it:

- i posle toy takovata... 'and then he [no translation] ...'
- izyadoh ti takovata – I ate something of yours (perhaps: 'I ate your dessert'). Here the word takovata is used as a substitution for a noun.

==== Miscellaneous ====
- The commonly cited phenomenon of Bulgarian people shaking their head for "yes" and nodding for "no" is true, but the shaking and nodding are not identical to the Western gestures. The "nod" for no is actually an upward movement of the head rather than a downward one, while the shaking of the head for yes is not completely horizontal, but also has a slight "wavy" aspect to it. This makes the Bulgarian gestures for yes and no compatible with the Western ones, and allows one to use either system unambiguously.
  - A dental click [ǀ] (similar to the English "tsk") also means "no" (informal), as does ъ-ъ [ʔəʔə] (the only occurrence in Bulgarian of the glottal stop). The two are often said with the upward 'nod'.
  - The head-shaking gesture used to signify "no" in Western Europe may also be used interrogatively, with the meaning of "what is it?" or "what's wrong?".
- Bulgarian has an extensive vocabulary covering family relationships. The biggest range of words is for uncles and aunts, e.g. chicho (your father's brother), vuicho (your mother's brother), svako (your aunt's husband); an even larger number of synonyms for these three exists in the various dialects of Bulgarian, including kaleko, lelincho, tetin, etc. The words do not only refer to the closest members of the family (such as brat – brother, but batko/bate – older brother, sestra – sister, but kaka – older sister), but extend to its furthest reaches, e.g. badzhanak from Turkish bacanak (the relationship of the husbands of two sisters to each other) and etarva (the relationships of two brothers' wives to each other). For all in-laws, there are specific names, e.g. a woman's husband's brother is her dever and her husband's sister is her zalva. In the traditional rural extended family before 1900, there existed separate subcategories for different brothers-in-law/sisters-in-law of a woman with regard to their age relative to hers, e.g. instead of simply a dever there could be a braino (older), a draginko (younger), or an ubavenkyo (who is still a child).
- As with many Slavic languages, the double negative in Bulgarian is grammatically correct, while some forms of it, when used instead of a single negative form, are grammatically incorrect. The following are literal translations of grammatically correct Bulgarian sentences that utilize a double or multiple negation: "Никой никъде никога нищо не е направил." (multiple negation without the use of a compound double negative form, i.e. using a listing of several successive single negation words) – "Nobody never nowhere nothing did not do." (translated as "nobody has ever done anything, anywhere"); "Никога не съм бил там." (double negation without the use of a compound double negative form, i.e. using a listing of several successive single negation words) – I never did not go there ("[I] have never been there"); Никога никакви чувства не съм имал! – I never no feelings had not have! (I have never had any feelings!). The same applies for Macedonian.

== Numerals ==
In Bulgarian, the numerals 1 and 2 are inflected for gender.

Furthermore, cardinal numerals take special endings when:

- referring to men (2–6 and 10) – add "-ma"
  - e.g. 2 chairs – dva stola; 2 brothers – dvama bratya
- referring to an approximate number (10–100 and, rarely, 7–9) – add "-ina"
  - e.g. dvadeset dushi – 20 people; dvadesetina dushi – about 20 people
- they are used as common nouns – add the feminine "-ka/-tsa"

No.	Cardinal numerals	numbers relating to men	"roundabout" numbers	ordinal numbers	as a common noun	notes / other
1	edìn (masc) – ednà (fem) ednò (neut) – ednì (plur.) *	–	–	prav / pàrvi/-a/-o/-i	edinìtsa	vednàzh – once
2	dva (masc) – dve (fem/neut)	dvàma	–	vtòri/-a/-o/-i	dvòyka	polovìn(a/ka) – half
3	tri	trìma	–	trèti/-a/-o/-i	tròyka	
4	chètiri	chetirìma	–	chetvàrti/-a/-o/-i	chetvòrka	chètvart, (chetvartìn(k)a) – quarter
5	pet	petìma	–	pèti/-a/-o/-i	petìtsa (petòrka)	–
6	shest	shestìma	–	shèsti/-a/-o/-i	shestìtsa (shestòrka)	–
7	sèdem	*	(sedmìna)	sèdmi/-a/-o/-i	sedmìtsa (sedmòrka)	–
8	òsem		(osmìna)	òsmi	osmìtsa (osmòrka)	–
9	dèvet		(devetina)	devèti	devyàtka (devètka)	–
10	dèset	desetìma	desetina	desèti	desyàtka (desètka)	–
11	edinàdeset (edinàyse(t))	(edinadesetìma / edinaysetìma)	edinadesetìna (edinaysetìna)	edinàdeseti (edinàys(e)ti)	edinàdesetka (edinàys(t)ka) / edinadesetìtsa (edinays(e)tìtsa)	from "edìn-na-dèset" – "one-on-ten", etc.
12	dvanàdeset (dvanàyse(t))	(dvanadesetìma / dvanaysetìma)	dvanadesetìna (dvanaysetìna)	dvanàdeseti (dvanàys(e)ti)	dvanàdesetka (dvanàys(t)ka) / dvanadesetìtsa (dvanays(e)tìtsa)	–
20	dvàdeset (dvàyse(t))	(dvadesetìma / dvaysetìma)	dvadesetìna (dvaysetìna)	dvàdeseti (dvàys(e)ti)	dvàdesetka (dvàys(t)ka) / dvadesetìtsa (dvays(e)tìtsa)	"dva-dèset" – "twice ten", etc.
21	dvadeset i edno (dvàyse(t) i edno)	–	–	dvàdeset i pàrvi	dvàdeset (dvàyset) i edinìtsa	–
22	dvadeset i dve (dvàyse(t) i dve)	(dvàdeset / dvàyset i dvàma)	–	dvàdeset (dvàyse(t)) i vtòri	dvàdeset (dvàyset) i dvòyka / (dvàys-dvòyka)	(...'23' – dvàys-tròyka, etc.)
30	trìdeset (trìyse(t))	–	tridesetìna (triysetìna)	trìdeseti (trìys(e)ti)	trìdesetka (trìys(t)ka) / tridesetitsa (triys(e)tìtsa)	–
100	sto	stotìma	stotìna	stòt-en/na/no/ni	stotìtsa	nyàkolkostotin... – several hundred... *
200	dvèsta	–	(òkolo 200 – "around 200")	(dvèstoten)	–	300 – trìsta
400	chètiristotin	–	–	(chètiristoten)	–	500–900 – same pattern
1,000	hilyàda	–	–	hìlyaden	hilyadàrka	2,000 – dve hìlyadi, etc.
0	nùla	–	–	nùlev/-a/-o/-i	nùla	nìkolko – none

Notes:

- In Bulgarian, numerals can be used directly before uncountable nouns – e.g. voda "water" → edna voda "a glass of water" (the quantifier 'glass of' is inferred from the context – comp. English 'a beer').
- The word edni can be translated as "some" – e.g. edni tzigari "some cigarettes" (comp. Spanish unos/unas).
- When counting, the neuter numbers are taken – edno, dve, tri....
- Fractions are the same as the ordinal numbers, and are done in the feminine 1/5 – edna peta, 2/5 – dve peti, etc.
- The words for men can be used by themselves, without a noun following – e.g. simply "vidyah dvama" – I saw two men, or even colloquially "edni dvama..." – these two men...
- Irregularly, "sedmina" and "osmina" can be used (archaically, poetically) to also mean "7/8 men" rather than "around 7/8".
- The smaller denomination of the Bulgarian currency – the stotìnka (pl. stotìnki) literally mean "hundredths" (diminutive); 100 stotinki = 1 lev.
