= Bulgarian nouns =

Bulgarian nouns have the categories: grammatical gender, number, case (only vocative) and definiteness. A noun has one of three specific grammatical genders (masculine, feminine, neuter) and two numbers (singular and plural), with cardinal numbers and some adverbs, masculine nouns use a separate count form. Definiteness is expressed by a definite article which is postfixed to the noun.

== Noun formation ==
Nouns can be formed from other words by means of suffixes. Some important suffixes that are used to form nouns are:

- -ар for male people (рибар – fisher, книжар – bookseller, бръснар – barber);
- -ач for male people (носач – carrier, купувач – buyer, продавач – seller);
- -тел for male people (учител – teacher, родител – parent, строител – builder);
- -ин for male people (българин – a Bulgarian, гражданин – citizen, селянин – villager);
- -ик for male people (виновник – culprit, изменик – betrayer, довереник – agent);
- -ец for male people (летец – flier, хубавец – handsome man, планинец – mountaineer);
- -ица for:
  - female people (царица – queen, певица – singer, хубавица – belle);
  - female animals (лъвица – lioness, слоница – elephantess, магарица – jennet);
  - feminine diminutives (водица – water, главица – head, сестрица – sister);
  - feminine objects (ножица – scissors, вилица – fork, солница – saltern);
  - products for eating and drinking (лютеница – pepper puree, наденица – sausage, сливовица – plum-brandy);
- -ка for:
  - female people (учителка – female teacher, лекарка – female doctor, студентка – female university student);
  - feminine diminutives (градинка – garden, картинка – picture, калинка – ladybird);
- -ник for:
  - objects (хладилник – refrigerator, чайник – teapot, калник – mud-guard);
  - places with certain purpose (рибарник – breeding-pond, рудник – colliery);
- -иня for female people (богиня – goddess, боркиня – woman fighter, немкиня – a German woman/girl);
- -алня for places with certain purpose (читалня – reading-room, съблекалня – changing-room);
- -ище for:
  - places where something is done (училище – school, читалище – library club, игрище – playground);
  - augmentatives (мъжище, женище, детище);
- -ница for places where something is done (бръснарница – barber's, млекарница – milk shop);
- -ство for:
  - places where a department is located (издателство – publishing house, посолство – embassy);
  - the names of certain activities (тъкачество – weaving, шивачество – needlecraft);
  - the names of certain qualities (удобство – convenience, нехайство – carelessness);
  - collective nouns (войнство – army, студентство – students);
- -а for the names of some actions (просвета – education, проява – act/deed);
- -ба for the names of some actions (борба – fight, молба – request);
- -ние for the names of some action (учение – teaching, писание – writing);
- -ина for the names of abstract qualities (топлина – warmth, бързина – quickness);
- -еж for the names of some actions (строеж – building, стремеж – striving);
- -итба for the names of some actions (сеитба – sowing, коситба – mowing);
- -не for the names of some actions (четене – reading, писане – writing);
- -ост for the names of abstract qualities (младост – youth, твърдост – hardness);
- -ие for abstract nouns (съгласие – agreement, усилие – effort);
- -е for masculine diminutives (столе – small chair, пръсте – small finger);
- -ота for the names of abstract qualities (топлота – warmth, красота – beauty);
- -ле for masculine diminutives (носле – small nose, вратле — neck);
- -че for masculine diminutives (братче – brother, столче – small chair);
- -ичка for feminine diminutives (водичка — water, главичка – small head);
- -це for neuter diminutives (крилце – small wing, селце – small village);

== Gender ==
In Bulgarian nouns have three genders: masculine, feminine and neuter. The gender is an inherent characteristic of every noun. This means that each noun is masculine, feminine or neuter. Only nouns referring to people or animals can change their gender. In most cases the gender of the noun can be determined according to its ending, but there aren't any strict rules. Masculines are all the nouns which refer to male people or animals, and many more.

Noun endings
Gender	Ending		Examples
Masculine	a consonant (most of the nouns)		мъж, град, брат
Masculine	a vowel (in some special cases)	а (when the noun refers to a male person)	баща, войвода
Masculine	a vowel (in some special cases)	я (when the noun refers to a male person)	съдия, бояджия
Masculine	a vowel (in some special cases)	о (when the noun refers to a male person)	татко, дядо, чичо
Masculine	a vowel (in some special cases)	е (when the noun refers to a male person)	аташе
Masculine	a vowel (in some special cases)	и (the names of most months)	януари, февруари, юни, юли, септември, октомври, ноември, декември
Feminine	a vowel (most of the nouns)	а	жена, вода, родина
Feminine	a vowel (most of the nouns)	я	земя, стая, идея
Feminine	a consonant – usually ending in –ст and –щ, but also others		страст (passion), пропаст (ravine), съвест (conscience), младост (youth), доблест (valour); нощ (night), пещ (furnace), помощ (help), свещ (candle); цев (gun barrel), скръб (sorrow), гибел (doom), цел (aim), вечер (evening), пролет (spring), смърт (death), любов (love)
Neuter	always a vowel	о	село, дърво
Neuter	always a vowel	е	дете, море
Neuter	always a vowel	и, у, ю (loanwords)	такси, бижу, меню

Masculine nouns that end in -а/-я (usually feminine) or -о/-е/-и (usually neuter), however, still take respectively feminine or neuter forms of the definite article.

Nouns referring to people or animals can change their gender (from masculine to feminine) by adding the suffixes: -ка, -ица, -а, -иня:

учител — учителка
цар — царица
лъв — лъвица
дебелан — дебелана
бог — богиня

The gender of nouns that have no singular form can't be determined: финанси, очила, обуща.

Some nouns have changed gender with time, for example the feminine vecher (evening — it retains its masculine character in the phrase dobur vecher – good evening), or var (lime). Some words, in spoken Bulgarian at least, can take either gender, e.g. domat/domata (tomato — masc/fem) or sandal/sandala (sandal); some can take either gender with slight variations in meaning, e.g. gaz (gas) or prah (dust); while others, usually for etymological reasons, can have completely different meanings – e.g. med means "honey" in the masculine, and "copper" in the feminine, or prust, meaning finger (masc), or soil (fem).

== Number ==
A noun has singular (единствено) and plural (множествено) number (число). Unlike in English, where almost all nouns add -s in the plural, in Bulgarian there are many endings and despite the rules listed below one cannot be absolutely sure which ending to use with which noun. Besides, when forming the plural some nouns alter additionally. That is why a noun should always be learnt together with its plural form. Generally if the noun ends in a vowel, it is removed before adding the plural suffix. Sometimes the stress changes position.

Plural endings
Gender	Ending	Examples	Additional alterations	Examples
Masculine	и (most of the nouns having two or more syllables and a few monosyllabic nouns)	наро̀д—наро̀ди баща̀—бащѝ съдия̀—съдѝи геро̀й—геро̀и зъб—зъ̀би лъч—лъчѝ го̀ст—го̀сти	A change from the velar consonants к, г, х, which are exactly before the ending -и, to ц, з, с respectively This change does not occur with loanwords ending in -нг (-ng)	езѝк—езѝци, по̀длог—по̀длози, кожу̀х—кожу̀си; loanwords: мѝтинг—мѝтинги (meeting), ло̀зунг—ло̀зунги (Losung)
Masculine	и (most of the nouns having two or more syllables and a few monosyllabic nouns)	наро̀д—наро̀ди баща̀—бащѝ съдия̀—съдѝи геро̀й—геро̀и зъб—зъ̀би лъч—лъчѝ го̀ст—го̀сти	Losing the sound е in the final part of the word	чужденѐц—чужденцѝ
Masculine	и (most of the nouns having two or more syllables and a few monosyllabic nouns)	наро̀д—наро̀ди баща̀—бащѝ съдия̀—съдѝи геро̀й—геро̀и зъб—зъ̀би лъч—лъчѝ го̀ст—го̀сти	Losing the sound ъ in the final part of the word. This happens almost always and not only when adding и	теа̀тър—теа̀три; exception: пода̀рък—пода̀ръци
Masculine	и (most of the nouns having two or more syllables and a few monosyllabic nouns)	наро̀д—наро̀ди баща̀—бащѝ съдия̀—съдѝи геро̀й—геро̀и зъб—зъ̀би лъч—лъчѝ го̀ст—го̀сти	Losing the sound е in the final part of the word and inserting ъ before л, or р	беглѐц—бегълцѝ
Masculine	и (most of the nouns having two or more syllables and a few monosyllabic nouns)	наро̀д—наро̀ди баща̀—бащѝ съдия̀—съдѝи геро̀й—геро̀и зъб—зъ̀би лъч—лъчѝ го̀ст—го̀сти	Losing the suffix -ин	бъ̀лгарин—бъ̀лгари
Masculine	и (most of the nouns having two or more syllables and a few monosyllabic nouns)	наро̀д—наро̀ди баща̀—бащѝ съдия̀—съдѝи геро̀й—геро̀и зъб—зъ̀би лъч—лъчѝ го̀ст—го̀сти	A change from е (when it is after a vowel) to й	боѐц—бойцѝ
Masculine	и (most of the nouns having two or more syllables and a few monosyllabic nouns)	наро̀д—наро̀ди баща̀—бащѝ съдия̀—съдѝи геро̀й—геро̀и зъб—зъ̀би лъч—лъчѝ го̀ст—го̀сти	A combination of the above alterations, for example losing the sound ъ in the final part of the word and a change from к to ц	мо̀мък—момци
Masculine	ове (most of the monosyllabic nouns and a few disyllabic nouns)	град—градовè стол—столòве блок—блокòве вятър—ветровè	A change of the stress position	грàд—градовè, стòл—столòве
Masculine	ове (most of the monosyllabic nouns and a few disyllabic nouns)	град—градовè стол—столòве блок—блокòве вятър—ветровè	A change from я to е (apophony)	бряг—бреговè
Masculine	ове (most of the monosyllabic nouns and a few disyllabic nouns)	град—градовè стол—столòве блок—блокòве вятър—ветровè	Metathesis of ъ in the letter group ръ	връх—върховè
Masculine	ове (most of the monosyllabic nouns and a few disyllabic nouns)	град—градовè стол—столòве блок—блокòве вятър—ветровè	Palatalization of the preceding consonant, indicated by the letter ь	зет—зèтьове
Masculine	ове (most of the monosyllabic nouns and a few disyllabic nouns)	град—градовè стол—столòве блок—блокòве вятър—ветровè	A combination of the above alterations	вятър—ветровè (a change from я to е, and losing ъ in the final part of the word), огън—огньòве (palatalization of the preceding consonant and losing ъ in the final part of the word)
Masculine	еве (most monosyllabic nouns ending in й)	брой – броевè	—	—
Masculine	е (only a few nouns)	мъж—мъжè кòн—конè	The stress always falls on the last syllable	крàл—кралè, княз—князè, цàр—царè
Masculine	а (only a few nouns)	крàк—кракà рòг—рогà	The stress always falls on the last syllable	лист—листà
Masculine	а (only a few nouns)	крàк—кракà рòг—рогà	Losing the suffix -ин	господин—господà
Masculine	я (only one noun)	брат—брàтя	—	—
Masculine	ища (only a few nouns)	път—пътища край—крàища сън—сънища	—	—
Masculine	чета (some diminutives formed with the suffix -ец)	градче—градчета	—	—
Masculine	овци (nouns referring to people)	чичо—чичовци дядо—дядовци мързелан—мързелановци	—	—
Feminine	и (almost all nouns)	жена—жени цел—цели стая—стаи вест—вести стойност—стойности	A change from я to е (apophony)	вяра—вери
Feminine	и (almost all nouns)	жена—жени цел—цели стая—стаи вест—вести стойност—стойности	Losing е and ъ in the final part of the word	песен—песни, мисъл—мисли
Feminine	и (almost all nouns)	жена—жени цел—цели стая—стаи вест—вести стойност—стойности	Metathesis of ъ in the letter group ръ	кръв—кърви
Feminine	е (only the following nouns)	овца—овце свиня—свине	A change from the velar consonants к and г to ц and з respectively	ръка—ръце, нога—нозе
Neuter	а (nouns, ending in -о, -це, -щe)	дърво—дърва петънце—петънца училище—училища	A change of the stress position	сèло—селà
Neuter	а (nouns, ending in -о, -це, -щe)	дърво—дърва петънце—петънца училище—училища	A change from я to е (apophony)	тя̀ло—телà
Neuter	та (nouns ending in -ле, -е, -че, and loanwords ending in -у, -ю, -и)	носле—нослета море—морета братче—братчета бижу—бижута меню—менюта такси—таксита	—	—
Neuter	я (nouns ending in -ие and a few more)	изключение—изключения допълнение—допълнения	A change of the stress position	цвèте—цветя̀, ло̀зе—лозя̀
Neuter	на (only a few nouns ending in -ме)	ѝме—имена̀ врѐме—времена̀	The stress always falls on the last syllable	зна̀ме—знамена̀, плѐме—племена̀
Neuter	са (very few nouns)	чу̀до—чудеса̀ небѐ—небеса̀	A change of the final о into е	чу̀до—чудеса̀
Neuter	са (very few nouns)	чу̀до—чудеса̀ небѐ—небеса̀	The stress always falls on the last syllable	небѐ—небеса̀
Neuter	и (not a large amount of nouns, ending in -о)	живо̀тно—живо̀тни насеко̀мо—насеко̀ми	A change from the velar consonants к and х to ч and ш respectively	око̀—очѝ, ухо̀-ушѝ

=== Count form ===
Masculine nouns which end in a consonant have an additional, specialized plural. This form is called the count form or numerical form (бройна форма — broyna forma), and is used only after cardinal numbers and the adverbs колко (how many), толкова (this/that/so many), няколко (several/a few/some): пет / колко / толкова / няколко молива versus тези моливи. An exception to this occurs in some exclamations following колко, when the ordinary plural is used and the inferred meaning is "what a large amount of!": e.g. колко коня? (kolko konya? "how many horses?" – numeric plural), but колко коне! (kolko kone! – ordinary plural, implying "look at all those horses!").

The count form is created with the endings -а and -я, and—unlike the usual plural—without any additional changes (no loss of the sounds -ъ and -е, no change of consonants, etc.), except for the moving of stress (it never falls on the last syllable, so if it is on the last syllable in the singular, it will move to the penultimate in the count form), and metathesis of ъ in the letter group ръ.

There are also a handful of neuter nouns for parts of the body which also take a count form – ramo (shoulder) → ramene / 2 ramena; kolyano (knee) → kolene / 2 kolena.

Count form endings
Ending	Examples
а (most nouns)	наро̀д—наро̀да съ̀д—съ̀да теа̀тър—теа̀търа лѝтър—лѝтра/лѝтъра* мѐтър—мѐтра/мѐтъра* дѐн—дѐна/днѝ** езѝк—езѝка бря̀г—бря̀га връх—върха
я (nouns ending in й, тел, ар, and a few more)	змѐй—змѐя двига̀тел—двига̀теля лѐкар—лѐкаря пъ̀т-пъ̀тя/пъти* ко̀н—ко̀ня зѐт—зетя кра̀л-кра̀ля ца̀р-цàря

* Some nouns have different count forms according to their meaning. When "литър" (litre) and "метър" (metre) mean measures of volume and length, their count form is "литра" and "метра" respectively. But when "метър" means "meter" (a device that measures and records the amount of electricity, gas, water, etc.) its count form is "метъра". The case is the same with "път": път ("road") – пътя and път ("time", "occasion", "instance") – пъти. The nouns "литър" and "метър" are the only ones that lose the "ъ" in their count forms.

** The usual plural form of the noun "ден" (day) is "дни" and its count form is "дена". "Дни" can be used instead of "дена", but not vice versa. The combinations of words два дни and два дена are both correct, but the sentence Зимните дена са студени (Winter days are cold) is incorrect. The usual form must be used, not the count one – Зимните дни са студени.

The count form is avoided with nouns denoting persons and in such cases the usual plural form is much more preferred (колко ученици – how many students, осем ученици — eight students).

The usual form is also used after masculine numbers (in Bulgarian some cardinal numbers have gender), ending in -ма (these forms of the numbers are used only with male persons, not with other masculine nouns denoting inanimate objects) – двама ученици (two students), петима ученици (five students).

=== Irregular and variant forms ===
Some nouns have irregular plural forms:

- човек/čovek (person) — хора/hora (people) — души/duši (people — numerical form)
- дете/dete (child) — деца/deca (children)

Some neuter nouns have two or more plural forms (most of them with no difference in meaning). For example: кълбо — кълба and кълбета, крило — крила and криле, рамо — рамена and рамене, коляно — колена and колене, море — морета and моря, дърво — дървета, дърва and дървеса, четене — четения and четенета. Some plural forms have different meanings: дърва – fuel wood, дървета – trees; some are used in specific contexts: the variants моря (from море), поля (from поле) are found only in poetry.

In Bulgarian, there are some nouns that are only found in the singular, and they are uncountable. This category includes some abstract nouns (материализъм – materialism, сигурност – security, любов — love); some collective nouns (студентство – students); and chemical elements and some other substances (водород – hydrogen, въглерод – carbon, грис – semolina, ориз – rice). There are also words which have only plural forms. These are nouns referring to objects composed of two identical parts (очила – glasses, ножици – scissors), and some concepts and objects consisting of many elements (въглища – coal, финанси – finances, пари – money).

== Definiteness ==
In Bulgarian, nouns have the grammatical category of definiteness (определеност). The morphological indicator of definiteness is the presence of a special morpheme, called the definite article (определителен член). The definite article is placed after the noun and is written together with it. The use of the definite article in Bulgarian is called членуване.

Definite articles
Gender and number	Article	Examples	Additional alterations	Examples
Masculine Singular	-ът/а* (most nouns ending in a consonant)	човѐк—човѐкът/човѐка вя̀тър—вя̀търът/вя̀търа кло̀н—кло̀нът/кло̀на	A change of the stress position (most monosyllabic nouns)	гра̀д—градъ̀т/града̀ мъ̀ж—мъжъ̀т/мъжа̀
Masculine Singular	-ът/а* (most nouns ending in a consonant)	човѐк—човѐкът/човѐка вя̀тър—вя̀търът/вя̀търа кло̀н—кло̀нът/кло̀на	A change from я to е (regular apophony)	бря̀г—брегъ̀т/брега̀ гря̀х—грехъ̀т/греха̀
Masculine Singular	-ът/а* (most nouns ending in a consonant)	човѐк—човѐкът/човѐка вя̀тър—вя̀търът/вя̀търа кло̀н—кло̀нът/кло̀на	Metathesis of ъ in the letter group ръ	връ̀х—върхъ̀т/върха̀ гръ̀б—гърбъ̀т/гърба̀
Masculine Singular	-ът/а* (most nouns ending in a consonant)	човѐк—човѐкът/човѐка вя̀тър—вя̀търът/вя̀търа кло̀н—кло̀нът/кло̀на	Losing the sound ъ in the suffix -зъм. This happens always.	ентусиа̀зъм—ентусиа̀змът/ентусиа̀зма органѝзъм—органѝзмът/органѝзма
Masculine Singular	-ят/я* (nouns ending in -й, -тел, -ар and a few more)	змѐй—змѐят/змѐя двига̀тел—двига̀телят/двига̀теля лѐкар—лѐкарят/лѐкаря ко̀н—ко̀нят/ко̀ня зѐт—зѐтят/зѐтя о̀гън—о̀гънят/о̀гъня	—	—
Masculine Singular	-та (all nouns ending in -а or -я)	баща̀—баща̀та съдия̀—съдия̀та	—	—
Masculine Singular	-то (all nouns ending in -о)	дя̀до—дя̀дото чѝчо—чѝчото	—	—
Feminine Singular	-та (all nouns)	жена̀—жена̀та земя̀—земя̀та вя̀ра—вя̀рата цѐл—целта̀ вѐст—вестта̀ сто̀йност—стойността̀	A change of the stress position (nouns ending in a consonant)	любо̀в—любовта̀ ста̀рост—старостта̀
Feminine Singular	-та (all nouns)	жена̀—жена̀та земя̀—земя̀та вя̀ра—вя̀рата цѐл—целта̀ вѐст—вестта̀ сто̀йност—стойността̀	A change from я to е (regular apophony)	зря̀лост—зрелостта̀ ця̀лост—целостта̀
Neuter Singular	-то (all nouns)	детѐ—детѐто сѐло—сѐлото таксѝ—таксѝто	—	—
Plural (all three genders)	-те (all nouns ending in -е or -и, regardless of their gender)	мъжѐ—мъжѐте женѝ—женѝте ръцѐ—ръцѐте очѝ—очѝте	—	—
Plural (all three genders)	-та (all nouns ending in -а or -я, regardless of their gender)	рога̀—рога̀та книжа̀—книжа̀та деца̀—деца̀та цветя̀—цветя̀та	—	—

* Nouns that end in a consonant and are masculine use –ът/–ят (the so called пълен член, "full article"), when they are grammatical subjects, and –а/–я (the so called кратък член, "short article"), when they are grammatical objects. This rule is observed only in writing. In speech, there is no distinction between the full and the short article, and the short form is normally used in all cases.

There is an additional discrepancy between pronunciation and spelling when the stress of some monosyllabic masculine nouns falls on the definite articles -а or -ят/я.

Discrepancy between spelling and pronunciation
Correct spelling Incorrect pronunciation	Correct pronunciation Incorrect spelling
мъжа	мъжъ
сънят	съньъ(т)
съня	съньъ

== Case ==
In Bulgarian masculine and feminine nouns have two cases (падежи) Nominative (Именителен падеж) and Vocative (Звателен падеж). The vocative is used when addressing a person or a thing, in all other cases the nominative is used. Theoretically, all masculine and feminine nouns can be declined in the vocative but vocative forms are used mainly with personal names and with nouns denoting people.

Vocative case endings
Gender	Ending	Examples	Additional alterations	Examples
Masculine	-e most nouns ending in a consonant	Ива̀н—Ива̀не наро̀д—наро̀де профѐсор—профѐсоре господѝн—господѝне	Losing the sound ъ in the final part of the word	Пѐтър—Пѐтре Димѝтър—Димѝтре
Masculine	-e most nouns ending in a consonant	Ива̀н—Ива̀не наро̀д—наро̀де профѐсор—профѐсоре господѝн—господѝне	A change from the consonants г or з, which are exactly before the ending, to ж, or from к to ч	Бо̀г—Бо̀же кня̀з—кня̀же юна̀к—юна̀че
Masculine	-e most nouns ending in a consonant	Ива̀н—Ива̀не наро̀д—наро̀де профѐсор—профѐсоре господѝн—господѝне	Replacement of the ending -ец with ч	отѐц—о̀тче ста̀рец—ста̀рче
Masculine	-о all nouns ending in -к, -ч, -ц (with a few exceptions) and in -ин (except господин) and a few more	тъпа̀к—тъпа̀ко продава̀ч—продава̀чо хубавѐц—хубавѐцо бъ̀лгарин—бъ̀лгарино мъ̀ж—мъ̀жо	Losing the sound ъ in the final part of the word	мо̀мък—мо̀мко
Masculine	-о all nouns ending in -к, -ч, -ц (with a few exceptions) and in -ин (except господин) and a few more	тъпа̀к—тъпа̀ко продава̀ч—продава̀чо хубавѐц—хубавѐцо бъ̀лгарин—бъ̀лгарино мъ̀ж—мъ̀жо	Metathesis of ъ in the letter group ръ	гръ̀к—гъ̀рко
Masculine	-о all nouns ending in -к, -ч, -ц (with a few exceptions) and in -ин (except господин) and a few more	тъпа̀к—тъпа̀ко продава̀ч—продава̀чо хубавѐц—хубавѐцо бъ̀лгарин—бъ̀лгарино мъ̀ж—мъ̀жо	Palatalization of the consonant preceding the ending, indicated by the letter ь	зѐт—зѐтьо
Masculine	-ю all nouns ending in -тел, – ар, -й and a few more	прия̀тел—прия̀телю лѐкар—лѐкарю геро̀й—геро̀ю кра̀л—кралю̀	A change of the stress position	ца̀р-царю̀
Masculine	-и only one noun	Го̀спод—Го̀споди	—	—
Feminine	-о most nouns ending in -а	Кристѝна—Кристѝно ба̀ба—ба̀бо друга̀рка—друга̀рко*	A change of the stress position	сестра̀—сѐстро
Feminine	-йо nouns ending in a vowel + я	Бълга̀рия—Бълга̀рийо	—	—
Feminine	-ьо nouns ending in a consonant + я	лѐля—лѐльо	A change of the stress position	земя̀—зѐмьо
Feminine	-е all nouns ending in -ца, most nouns ending in -чка and рка, and all personal names ending in -ка	вѐщица—вѐщице тъпа̀чка—тъпа̀чке* дирѐкторка—дирѐкторке* Стѐфка—Стѐфке	—	—

*Most common nouns ending in -ка can be found both with the ending о and е (другарко/другарке, тъпачко/тъпачке). One of the forms is considered colloquial, but there aren't any strict rules which one. For example: the form другарко is found more often than другарке, but директорко (instead of директорке) sounds very odd. Generally, the form with о is ruder.

Feminine nouns which end in a consonant do not have vocative forms.

=== Usage of vocative ===
There is a difference in usage between vocative forms of common nouns and proper nouns. The former are used always, when addressing someone, and the use of nominative forms instead is immediately perceived as a gross error:

Definitely incorrect	Correct	Translation
Как сте, професор?	Как сте, професоре?	How are you, professor?
Пощадете живота ми, цар!	Пощадете живота ми, царю!	Spare my life, king!
Здравей, баба!	Здравей, бабо!	Hello, grandmother!

The latter, however, are considered informal, and are used less frequently, especially the vocative forms of female personal names ending in -о, which are even considered by some to be rude or rustic (Елено, Богдано). Nevertheless, nominative forms (especially the male ones) sound too formal, even snobbish, and are used rarely by native speakers. Instead, diminutives (Еленче, Богданче) or short forms (Ели, Боби) are preferred. Diminutives are used usually by elder people, when addressing younger ones.

Male vocative forms and female ones ending in е are used regularly and their substitution with nominative forms is also considered a gross error (or the speaker may sound too snobbish).

There is difference between the vocative form of both male and female short name forms and their other, non-vocative form (the form that is used in all other cases). The latter takes the definite article -та or -то, depending on the ending:

Name	Short form	Vocative form	Non-vocative form
Павел	Павка	Павка, ела тук! (Pavka, come here!)	Дадох книгата на Павката (I gave the book to Pavkata.)
Веселина	Веси	Веси, ще ми помогнеш ли? (Vesi, will you help me?)	Весито ми помогна. (Vesito helped me.)

== See also ==
- Bulgarian grammar
- wikt:bg:Начална страница (Bulgarian wiktionary)
