= Pronouns in French =

Words in French that substitute for a noun or noun phrase

In French, pronouns are inflected to indicate their role in the sentence (subject, direct object, and so on), as well as to reflect the person, gender, and number of their referents.

== Personal pronouns ==
French has a complex system of personal pronouns (analogous to English I, we, they, and so on). When compared to English, the particularities of French personal pronouns include:

- a T-V distinction in the second person singular (familiar tu vs. polite vous)
- the placement of object pronouns before the verb: « Agnès les voit. » ("Agnès sees them.")
- the existence of distinct pronouns for indirect objects and for certain prepositional objects
- the use of a distinct disjunctive form, e.g. for emphasis (moi, toi, etc.).

=== The three types of "you" in French ===
There are two words for you but they cover three distinct cases:

1. Singular "you": "Tu" is used to address someone informally.
2. Singular "you": "Vous" is used to address someone formally.
3. Plural "you": "Vous" is also used to address (formally or informally) two or more people.

== Possessive pronouns ==
Possessive pronouns refer to an object (or person) by identifying its possessor. They lexically indicate the person and number of the possessor, and like other pronouns they are inflected to indicate the gender and number of their referent. This is a key difference from English: in English, possessive pronouns are inflected to indicate the gender and number of their antecedent — e.g., in "the tables are his", the form "his" indicates that the antecedent (the possessor) is masculine singular, whereas in the French les tables sont les siennes, "siennes" or its base form "sien" indicates that the antecedent is third person singular but of unspecified gender while the inflection "-nes" indicates that the possessed noun "table" is feminine plural.

In French, the possessive pronouns are determined by the definite article le, la, les ("the"), depending on the gender and number of their referent; nonetheless, they are considered pronouns.

The following table lists the possessive pronouns by the possessor they indicate:

			possessed			
			singular		plural	
			masculine	feminine	masculine	feminine
possessor	1st person	singular	le mien	la mienne	les miens	les miennes
possessor	1st person	plural	le nôtre	la nôtre	les nôtres	
possessor	2nd person	singular	le tien	la tienne	les tiens	les tiennes
possessor	2nd person	plural	le vôtre	la vôtre	les vôtres	
possessor	3rd person	singular	le sien	la sienne	les siens	les siennes
possessor	3rd person	plural	le leur	la leur	les leurs	

Examples:

- « Est-ce que c'est ta fleur ou la mienne ? » ("Is this your flower or mine?")
- « Je parle à mon frère pendant que tu parles au tien. » ("I am talking to my brother while you are talking to yours.")

The term "possessive pronoun" is also sometimes applied to the possessive determiners ("my", "your", etc.), which are discussed at French articles and determiners.

== Interrogative pronouns ==
Like English, French has a number of different interrogative pronouns. They are organized here by the English pronoun to which they correspond:

- What:
  - As the direct object of a verb, que (or qu' before a vowel or mute "h") is used in front of the verb: « Que faites-vous ? » ("What are you doing?")
  - Also as the direct object of a verb, qu'est-ce que (or qu'est-ce qu' before a vowel or mute "h") is used, without subject-auxiliary inversion. This phrase is analysed as a single word: « Qu'est-ce que vous faites ? » ("What is it that you are doing?")
  - As the object of a preposition, or after the verb, quoi is used: « Après quoi aboie-t-il ? » ("At what is it barking?"), « Vous faites quoi ? » ("You are doing what?")
  - There is no indirect-object form; rather, a full prepositional phrase (with quoi) is used: « À quoi pensez-vous ? » ("About what are you thinking?")
  - As the subject form, qu'est-ce qui is used, without inversion: « Qu'est-ce qui vous dérange ? » ("What is it that bothers you?")
- Who, whom:
  - As the subject or direct object of a verb, or as the object of a preposition, qui is used: « Qui vous dérange ? » ("Who bothers you?")
  - There is no indirect-object form; rather, a full prepositional phrase (with qui) is used: « À qui avez-vous donné cela ? » ("To whom did you give that?")
  - Similarly to qu'est-ce qui or qu'est-ce que above, qui est-ce qui or qui est-ce que can also be used when referring to a person rather than a thing: « Qui est-ce qui vous dérange ? » — « À qui est-ce que vous avez donné cela ? » — « Qui est-ce qu'il a vu ? » (Whom did he see?)
- Which, which one(s):
  - The basic form is lequel (le + quel; see French articles and determiners for information about each component).
  - Both parts of lequel are inflected to agree with its referent in gender and number: hence, laquelle, lesquels, lesquelles.
  - The prepositions à and de contract with le and les to form au, aux, du, and des, respectively; this is still the case here. Thus, for example, auxquelles means "at/to which ones" (feminine), and duquel means "of/from which one" (masculine).

For more information on the formation of questions, see French grammar.

== Relative pronouns ==
French, like English, uses relative pronouns to introduce relative clauses. The relative pronoun used depends on its grammatical role (such as subject or direct object) within the relative clause, as well as on the gender and number of the antecedent and whether the antecedent represents a person. Further, like English, French distinguishes between ordinary relative clauses (which serve as adjectives) and other types.

=== In ordinary relative clauses ===
If the relative pronoun is to be the subject of the clause's verb, qui is ordinarily used: « l'homme qui a volé ma bicyclette » ("the man who stole my bike"). Note that qui in this use does not change form to agree in any way with its antecedent: « les bicyclettes qui ont été volées » ("the bikes that were stolen"). However, it may occasionally be replaced with a form of lequel to specify the antecedent's gender or number. For example, while the phrase « Jean et Marie, qui vole(nt) des bicyclettes » ("Jean and Marie, who steal(s) bicycles") is ambiguous in speech (since vole and volent are homophones), the phrases « Jean et Marie, laquelle vole des bicyclettes » ("Jean and Marie, who steals bicycles") and « Jean et Marie, lesquels volent des bicyclettes » ("Jean and Marie, who steal bicycles") are not: in the former, only Marie is being described, while in the latter, both Jean and Marie are. This substitution is very rare, however.

If the relative pronoun is to be the direct object of the clause's verb, que (or qu' before a vowel; see elision) is ordinarily used: « la bicyclette qu'il a volée » ("the bicycle that he stole"). Like qui, que does not change form to agree with its antecedent, and may occasionally be replaced with a form of lequel for the sake of clarity.

If the relative pronoun is to be the grammatical possessor of a noun in the clause (usually marked with de), dont is used: « le garçon dont j'ai volé la bicyclette » ("the boy from whom I stole the bicycle", "the boy whose bicycle I stole"). Note that unlike in English, the object of possession is not moved to appear immediately after dont; that is, dont, unlike whose, is not a determiner.

Traditionally, if the relative pronoun was to be the object of a preposition in the clause (other than the de of possession), or the indirect object of the clause's verb, a form of lequel was used, with the preposition placed before it: « la femme de laquelle j'ai parlé » ("the woman about whom I spoke"). (Note that here, as in the interrogative case described above, à and de contract with most forms of lequel.) Nowadays, the form of lequel is typically replaced with qui when the antecedent is a person: « la femme de qui j'ai parlé ». Further, if the preposition is de, even if it is not the de of the possession, dont has started to be used (with both person and non-person antecedents): « la femme dont j'ai parlé ». (However, dont has not started to be used in the case of compound prepositions ending in de, such as à côté de, loin de, and à cause de: « la femme à cause de laquelle j'ai parlé », "the woman because of whom I spoke").

Alternatively, if the relative pronoun is to be an adverbial complement in the clause, introduced by the preposition à (or a similar preposition of time or place), où may be used: « la ville où j'habite » ("the city where I live"), « au moment où il a parlé » ("at the moment that he spoke").

=== In other relative clauses ===
When a relative clause is to serve as an inanimate noun, it is prefixed with ce: « ce que j'ai dit » ("that which I said", "what I said"). In a prepositional phrase after ce, the pronoun lequel is replaced with the pronoun quoi: « ce à quoi je pense » ("that about which I am thinking", "what I am thinking about"; note the non-contraction of ce), except that ce dont is usually preferred to ce de quoi ( both meaning "that of which").

When a relative clause serves as an animate noun usually a construction like « l'homme qui ... » ("the man who ...") is used, rather than a "he who" construction. However, qui is sometimes used alone: « Qui vivra, verra » ("Whoever lives, will see" "He who lives, will see").

When a relative clause is to serve as an adverb, it takes the same form as when it is to serve as an inanimate noun, except that ce is omitted before a preposition: « Ils sont allés dîner, après quoi ils sont rentrés » ("They went out to eat, after which they went home"); « Ils ne se sont pas du tout parlé, ce qui me semblait étrange » ("They did not talk to each other at all, which seemed strange to me").

== Demonstrative pronouns ==
French has several demonstrative pronouns. The pronouns ceci and cela / ça correspond roughly to English "this" and "that"; the pronoun celui corresponds to English "this one, that one; the one (which)". The major reason why there is confusion by native English speakers is that "this" and "that" are also used in English as demonstrative adjectives that correspond to the single French demonstrative adjective ce 'this; that' (declined as: cet m. before vowels, cette f. and ces m.pl.).

=== The pronouns ceci, cela, and ça ===
Ceci and cela correspond roughly to English "this" and "that", respectively. Ça is a truncated form of cela, used in standard spoken contexts. Unlike English this, French ceci is quite rare; its most common use is in writing, to refer to something that is about to be mentioned: « Ceci est le problème : il boit trop. » ("This is the problem: he drinks too much.") Cela and ça are often used even when English would use "this". When contrasting two people or things, the one nearer (in space or in the sentence) and the other farther, ceci and cela (or, for people, celui-ci and celui-là) are used in the same sentence the way English would use either this and that (or this one and that one) or the latter and the former respectively.

=== The pronoun celui ===
Celui corresponds to English "the one", "this one", and "that one". Since its purpose is to identify ("demonstrate") its referent, it is always accompanied by additional identifying information.

Like other pronouns, celui is inflected to agree with its antecedent in gender and number. Its forms are as follows:

	singular	plural
masculine	celui	ceux
feminine	celle	celles

As mentioned above, the demonstrative pronoun is always accompanied by additional identifying information. This information can come in any of the following forms:

- the suffix -ci or -là, attached with a hyphen. These suffixes indicate proximity and distance, respectively; celui-ci means "this one (masculine)," for example, while celle-là means "that one (feminine)." In writing, celui-ci (or another of its forms) is often used to mean "the latter", while celui-là means "the former".
- a relative clause. This construction is more common than in English; for example, English's "the blue one" may be rendered in French as celui qui est bleu (lit. "the one that is blue") — except that celui and bleu would be celle and bleue if the referent were feminine, and est "is" might be replaced by était "was" or sera "will be" or serait "would be". "The blue one" can also be rendered, especially in colloquial language, as le bleu (m.), la bleue (f.), which are closer to English, but, depending on context, the latter construction can, in the masculine, mean either "the blue one" or "blue" (the blue color).
- one of a few common expressions of location. For example, celui de gauche means "the one on the left (masculine)."
- de, followed by a possessor. For example, « Ceux de Marie sont cassés » ("The ones (masculine) of Marie are broken", "Marie's (masculine) are broken").
