= Neuter gender in modern and contemporary French =

Archaic grammatical gender

The neuter gender is a grammatical gender that existed in Latin and Old French, but no longer exists, apart from a few vestiges, in the Modern French language. Proposals to neutralise the language have been made, generally suggesting the creation of neologisms, to account for the perceived sexism of French and accommodate for non-binary people.

== Old French ==
Old French kept Latin's neuter form (neither masculine nor feminine) as the neuter pronoun el (or occasionally al), derived from the Latin illud, but this practice disappeared in the 12th Century. The demonstrative pronouns cest and cel that appear in the 12th and 13th Centuries are also neuter forms. The pronoun ce (first seen as ço or ceo) is also a neuter form and became used as an inflectional suffix.

== Modern French ==
=== Absence of Neuter Gender ===
In Modern French, there are only masculine and feminine grammatical genders. Linguist Éliane Viennot once said "French is a language with two genders". Similarly Daniel Elmiger claims that French "has a binary system in which the masculine gender has the more important role than the feminine gender".
