= List of linguistics journals =

The following is a partial list of linguistics journals.

== General ==
- Annual Review of Linguistics
- Glossa
- Journal of Linguistics
- Language
- Lingua
- Linguistic Inquiry
- Linguistic Typology
- Linguistics
- Linguistics Vanguard
- Natural Language and Linguistic Theory
- Studies in Language
- Theoretical Linguistics

== Applied linguistics ==
- Applied Linguistics
- Bilingualism: Language and Cognition
- Language Learning
- Language Testing
- Journal of Second Language Writing
- LEARN Journal
- System
- TESOL Quarterly
- The Modern Language Journal
- Colombian Applied Linguistics Journal

== Corpus linguistics ==
- Corpus Linguistics and Linguistic Theory
- International Journal of Corpus Linguistics

== Philology ==
- Archiv für das Studium der neueren Sprachen und Literaturen

== Phonetics and phonology ==
- Journal of Phonetics
- Journal of the Acoustical Society of America
- Journal of the International Phonetic Association
- Laboratory Phonology
- Phonetica
- Phonology

== Anthropological linguistics ==
- Anthropological Linguistics

== Sociolinguistics ==
- Language Variation and Change
- Journal of Sociolinguistics
- Language in Society
- Asia-Pacific Language Variation
- Journal of Language and Sexuality

== Area-specific ==
=== Africa ===
- Journal of West African Languages
- Arusha Working Papers in African Linguistics

=== East Asia ===
- Cahiers de Linguistique Asie Orientale
- Journal of Chinese Linguistics
- Himalayan Linguistics

=== Southeast Asia ===
- Journal of the Southeast Asian Linguistics Society
- Linguistics of the Tibeto-Burman Area

=== European ===
- Acta Linguistica Hungarica
- Nordic Journal of Linguistics
- Sámi Dieđalaš Áigečála
- Estudios de Fonética Experimental

=== Native American languages ===
- International Journal of American Linguistics
- Journal de la société des américanistes

=== Oceania and Australia ===
- Oceanic Linguistics
