= Subjuntivo =

Subjuntivo means subjunctive mood in Portuguese and Spanish.

It may refer to:

- Subjunctive mood in Portuguese
- Subjunctive mood in Spanish
