= Romance linguistics =

Scientific study of the Romance languages

Classifications of the different Romance languages

Romance linguistics is the scientific study of the Romance languages.

== Basic features ==
Romance languages have a number of shared features across all languages:

- Romance languages are moderately inflecting, i.e. there is a moderately complex system of affixes (primarily suffixes) that are attached to word roots to convey grammatical information such as number, gender, person, tense, etc. Verbs have much more inflection than nouns. The amount of synthesis is significantly more than English, but less than Classical Latin and much less than the oldest Indo-European languages (e.g. Ancient Greek and Sanskrit). Inflection is often fusional, with a single affix representing multiple features (as contrasted with agglutinative languages such as Turkish and Mongolian). For example, Portuguese amei "I loved" is composed of am- "love" and the fusional suffix -ei "first-person singular preterite indicative".
- Romance languages have a primarily subject–verb–object (SVO) word order, with varying degrees of flexibility from one language to another. Constructions are predominantly of the head-first (right-branching) type. Adjectives, genitives and relative clauses all tend to follow their head noun, although (except in Romanian) determiners usually precede.
- In general, nouns, adjectives and determiners inflect only according to grammatical gender (masculine or feminine) and grammatical number (singular or plural). Grammatical case is marked only on pronouns, as in English; case marking, as in English, is of the nominative–accusative type (rather than e.g. the ergative–absolutive marking of Basque or the split ergativity of Hindi). A significant exception, however, is Romanian, with three-case marking (nominative/accusative vs. genitive/dative and vocative) on nominal elements.
- Verbs are inflected according to a complex morphology that may mark person, number (singular or plural), tense, mood (indicative, subjunctive, imperative) and sometimes aspect or gender. Grammatical voice (active, passive, middle/reflexive) and some grammatical aspects (in particular, the perfect aspect) are expressed using periphrastic constructions, as in the Italian present perfect (passato prossimo) io ho amato/io sono stato amato "I have loved/I have been loved".
- Most Romance languages are null-subject languages (but modern French is not, as a result of the phonetic decay of verb endings).
- All Romance languages have two articles (definite and indefinite), and many have in addition a partitive article (expressing the concept of "some"). In some languages (notably, French), the use of an article with a noun is nearly obligatory; it serves to express grammatical number (no longer marked phonetically on most nouns) and to cope with the extreme homophony of French vocabulary as a result of extensive sound reductions.
- The phonemic inventory of most Romance languages is of moderate size with few unusual phonemes. Phonemic vowel length is uncommon. Some languages have developed nasal vowels or front rounded vowels.
- Word accent is of the stress (dynamic) type, rather than making use of pitch (as in Ancient Greek and some modern Slavic languages). Stress most often occurs on one of the last three syllables, with predictability varying by language.

== Changes from Classical Latin ==
=== Loss of the case system ===
The most significant changes between Classical Latin and Proto-Romance (and hence all the modern Romance languages) relate to the reduction or loss of the Latin case system and the syntactic changes that triggered.

The case system was drastically reduced from the six-case system of Classical Latin. Although five cases can be reconstructed for Vulgar Latin nouns (nominative, accusative, genitive, dative and ablative), for Proto-Romance this had been reduced to three: nominative, accusative-ablative and genitive-dative. This system is preserved best in pronouns. In the West, the genitive-dative disappeared with the genitive replaced by dē + ablative and the dative by ad + accusative. This left only two cases: nominative and oblique. (However, a morphologically unmarked genitive, the so-called juxtaposition genitive, syntactically still discernible, survives in Old French and Old Occitan, also leaving traces in Old Italian and some modern Italian dialects.) Some of the older Gallo-Romance languages (in particular, Old French, Old Occitan, Old Sursilvan and Old Friulian, and, in traces, Old Catalan and Old Venetian) preserved this two-case system well into the literary period; and in Ibero-Romance languages, such as Spanish and Portuguese, as well as in Italian (see under Case), a couple of examples are found which preserve the old nominative. In the East, a genitive-dative made entirely of dative forms was retained but the nominative and accusative-ablative eventually merged.

Concomitant with the loss of case marking, freedom of word order was greatly reduced. Classical Latin had a generally verb-final (SOV) but overall quite free word order, with a significant amount of word scrambling and mixing of left-branching and right-branching constructions. The Romance languages eliminated word scrambling and nearly all left-branching constructions, with most languages developing a rigid SVO, right-branching syntax. (Old French, however, had a freer word order due to the two-case system still present, as well as a predominantly verb-second word order developed under the influence of the Germanic languages.) Some freedom, however, is allowed in the placement of adjectives relative to their head noun. In addition, some languages (e.g., Spanish and Romanian) have an "accusative preposition" (Romanian pe, Spanish "personal a") along with clitic doubling, which allows for some freedom in ordering the arguments of a verb.

The Romance languages developed grammatical articles where Latin had none. Articles are often introduced around the time a robust case system falls apart in order to disambiguate the remaining case markers (which are usually too ambiguous by themselves) and to serve as parsing clues that signal the presence of a noun (a function that used to be served by the case endings themselves).

This was the pattern followed by the Romance languages: In those that still preserved a functioning nominal case system (e.g., Romanian and Old French), only the combination of article and case ending serves to uniquely identify number and case (compare the similar situation in modern German). All Romance languages have a definite article (originally developed from ipse "self" but replaced in nearly all languages by ille "that (over there)") and an indefinite article (developed from ūnus "one"). Many also have a partitive article (from dē "of" + definite article).

Latin had a large number of syntactic constructions expressed through infinitives, participles and similar nominal constructs. Examples are the ablative absolute, the accusative-plus-infinitive construction used for reported speech, gerundive constructions and the common use of reduced relative clauses expressed through participles. All of these are replaced in the Romance languages by subordinate clauses expressed with finite verbs, making the Romance languages much more "verbal" and less "nominal" than Latin. Under the influence of the Balkan sprachbund, Romanian has progressed the furthest, largely eliminating the infinitive. (It is being revived, however, due to the increasing influence of other Romance languages.)

=== Other changes ===
- Loss of phonemic vowel length, and change into a free-stressed language. Classical Latin had an automatically determined stress on the second or third syllable from the end, conditioned by vowel length; once vowel length was neutralized, stress was no longer predictable so long as it remained where it was (which it mostly did).
- Development of a series of palatal consonants as a result of palatalization.
- Loss of most traces of the neuter gender.
- Development of a series of analytic perfect tenses, comparable to English "I have done, I had done, I will have done".
- Loss of the Latin synthetic passive voice, replaced by an analytic construction comparable to English "it is/was done".
- Loss of deponent verbs, replaced by active-voice verbs.
- Replacement of the Latin future tense with a new tense formed (usually) by a periphrasis of infinitive + present tense of habēre "have", which usually contracts into a new synthetic tense. A corresponding conditional mood is formed in the same way, using one of the past-tense forms of habēre.
- Numerous lexical changes. A number of words were borrowed from the Germanic and Celtic languages. Many basic nouns and verbs, especially those that were short or had irregular morphology, were replaced by longer derived forms with regular morphology. Throughout the medieval period, words were borrowed from Classical Latin in their original form (learned words) or in something approaching the original form (semi-learned words), often replacing the popular forms of the same words.

== Phonology ==
=== Vowels ===
Every language has its own peculiar set of vowels. Common characteristics are as follows:

- Most languages have at least five monophthongs /a e i o u/. The parent language of most of the Italo-Western Romance languages (which includes the vast majority) actually had a seven-vowel system /a ɛ e i ɔ o u/, which is kept in most Italo-Western languages. In some languages, like Spanish and Romanian, the phonemic status and difference between open-mid and close-mid vowels was lost. French has probably the largest inventory of monophthongs, with conservative varieties having 12 oral vowels /a ɑ ɛ e i ɔ o u œ ø y ə/ and four nasal vowels /ɑ̃ ɛ̃ ɔ̃ œ̃/. European Portuguese also has a large inventory, with nine oral monophthongs /a ɐ ɛ e i ɔ o u ɨ/, five nasal monophthongs /ɐ̃ ẽ ĩ õ ũ/, and a large number of oral and nasal diphthongs (see below).
- Some languages have a large inventory of falling diphthongs. These may or may not be considered phonemic units (rather than sequences of vowel+glide or vowel+vowel), depending on their behavior. As an example, French, Spanish and Italian have occasional instances of putative falling diphthongs formed from a vowel plus a non-syllabic /i/ or /u/ (e.g. Spanish veinte [ˈbejnte] "twenty", deuda [ˈdewða] "debt"; French paille [pɑj] "straw", caoutchouc [kautʃu] "rubber"; Italian sei [ˈsɛi] "you are" and "six", neutro [ˈnɛutro] "neuter"), but these are normally analyzed as sequences of vowel and glide. The diphthongs in Romanian, Portuguese, Catalan, and Occitan, however, have various properties suggesting that they are better analyzed as unit phonemes. Portuguese, for example, has the diphthongs /aj ɐj ɛj ej ɔj oj uj aw ɛw ew iw (ow)/, where /ow/ (and to a lesser extent /ej/) appear only in some dialects. All except /aw ɛw/ appear frequently in verb or noun inflections. (Portuguese also has nasal diphthongs; see below.)
- Among the major Romance languages, Portuguese and French have nasal vowel phonemes, stemming from nasalization before a nasal consonant followed by loss of the consonant (this occurred especially when the nasal consonant was not directly followed by a vowel). Originally, vowels in both languages were nasalized before all nasal consonants, but have subsequently become denasalized before nasal consonants that still remain (except in Brazilian Portuguese, where the pre-nasal vowels in words such as cama "bed", menos "less" remain highly nasalized). In Portuguese, nasal vowels are sometimes analyzed as phonemic sequences of oral vowels plus an underlying nasal consonant, but such an analysis is difficult in French because of the existence of minimal pairs such as bon /bɔ̃/ "good (masc.)", bonne /bɔn/ "good (fem.)". In both languages, there are fewer nasal than oral vowels. Nasalization triggered vowel lowering in French, producing the four nasal vowels /ɑ̃ ɛ̃ ɔ̃ œ̃/ (although most speakers in France nowadays pronounce /œ̃/ as /ɛ̃/). Vowel raising was triggered in Portuguese, however, producing the five nasal vowels /ɐ̃ ẽ ĩ õ ũ/. Vowel contraction and other changes also resulted in the Portuguese nasal diphthongs /ɐ̃w̃ ɐ̃j̃ ẽj̃ õj̃ ũj̃/ (of which /ũj̃/ occurs in only two words, muito /mũj̃tu/ "much, many, very" and mui /mũj̃/ "very"; and /ẽj̃/ is actually a final-syllable allophone of /ẽ/).
- Most languages have fewer vowels in unstressed syllables than stressed syllables. This again reflects the Italo-Western Romance parent language, which had a seven-vowel system in stressed syllables (as described above) but only /a e i o u/ (with no low-mid vowels) in unstressed syllables. Some languages have seen further reductions: e.g. Standard Catalan has only [ə i u] in unstressed syllables. In French, on the other hand, any vowel may take prosodic stress.
- Most languages have even fewer vowels in word-final unstressed syllables than elsewhere. For example, Old Italian allowed only /a e i o/, while the early stages of most Western Romance languages allowed only /a e o/. The Gallo-Romance languages went even farther, deleting all final vowels except /a/. Of these languages, French has carried things to the extreme by deleting all vowels after the accented syllable and uniformly accenting the final syllable (except for a more-or-less non-phonemic final unstressed [ə] that occasionally appears). Modern Spanish now allows final unstressed /i u/, and modern Italian allows final unstressed /u/, but they tend to occur largely in borrowed or onomatopoeic words, e.g. guru "guru", taxi "taxi", Spanish tribu "tribe" and espíritu "spirit" (loanwords from Classical Latin), Italian babau ~ baubau "bogeyman" (onomatopoeic, cf. English "boo!"). The apparent Spanish exception casi "almost" originates from Latin quasi "as if" < quam sī, and was probably influenced by si "if".
- Phonemic vowel length is uncommon. Vulgar Latin lost the phonemic vowel length of Classical Latin and replaced it with a non-phonemic length system where stressed vowels in open syllables were long, and all other vowels were short. Standard Italian still maintains this system, and it was rephonemicized in the Gallo-Romance languages (including the Rhaeto-Romance languages) as a result of the deletion of many final vowels. Some northern Italian languages (e.g. Friulian) still maintain this secondary phonemic length, but in most languages the new long vowels were either diphthongized or shortened again, in the process eliminating phonemic length. French is again the odd man out: Although it followed a normal Gallo-Romance path by diphthongizing five of the seven long vowels and shortening the remaining two, it phonemicized a third vowel-length system around AD 1300 in syllables that had been closed with an /s/ (still marked with a circumflex accent), and now is phonemicizing a fourth system as a result of lengthening before final voiced fricatives.

=== Consonants ===
Most Romance languages have similar sets of consonants. The following is a combined table of the consonants of the five major Romance languages (French, Spanish, Italian, Portuguese and Romanian).

Key:

- bold: Appears in all five languages.
- italic: Appears in three or four languages.
- (parentheses): Appears in two languages.
- ((double parentheses)): Appears in only one language.

Notable changes:

- Spanish has no phonemic voiced fricatives (however, [β ð ɣ] occur as allophones of /b d ɡ/ after a vowel and after certain consonants). The equivalent of /v/ merged with /b/, and all the rest became voiceless. It also lost /ʃ/, which became /x/ or /h/ in some other dialects.
- The western languages (French, Spanish and Portuguese) all used to have the affricates /ts/, /dz/, /tʃ/, /dʒ/. By the fourteenth century or so, these all turned into fricatives except for Spanish and dialectal Portuguese /tʃ/. (Spanish /ts/ ended up becoming /θ/, at least in Northern and Central and some parts of Southern Spain; elsewhere, it merged with /s/, as in some other Romance languages, such as French and Portuguese.) Romanian /dz/ likewise became /z/.
- French, and most varieties of Spanish, have lost /ʎ/ (which merged with /j/). Romanian merged both /ʎ/ and /ɲ/ into /j/.
- Romanian was influenced by Slavic phonology, most notably in the palatalization of consonants in the plural form (for example pomi [pomʲ] and lupi [lupʲ]).

Most instances of most of the sounds below that occur (or used to occur, as described above) in all of the languages are cognate. However:

- Although all of the languages have or used to have /tʃ/, almost none of these sounds are cognate between pairs of languages. The only real exception is many /tʃ/ between Italian and Romanian, stemming from Latin C- before E or I. Italian also has /tʃ/ from Vulgar Latin -CI-, and from -TI- following a consonant (elsewhere /ts/). Romanian also has /tʃ/ from -TI- before a stressed syllable. Former French /tʃ/ is from Latin C- before A, either word-initial or following a consonant; Spanish /tʃ/ is from Latin -CT-, or from PL, CL following a consonant; former Portuguese /tʃ/ is from Latin PL, CL, FL, either word-initial or following a consonant.
- Italian and former Romanian /dz/ (from some instances of Vulgar Latin -DI-) are not cognate with former western /dz/ (from lenition of /ts/).

Romance consonants
	Bilabial		Labio- dental		Interdental		Dental/ Alveolar		Post- alveolar		Palatal		Velar/ Uvular		Glottal
	Voiceless	Voiced	Voiceless	Voiced	Voiceless	Voiced	Voiceless	Voiced	Voiceless	Voiced	Voiceless	Voiced	Voiceless	Voiced	Voiceless
Nasal		**m**						**n**				ɲ			
Plosive	**p**	**b**					**t**	**d**					**k**	**ɡ**	
Affricate							(ts)	((dz))	tʃ	(dʒ)					
Fricative			**f**	v	((θ))		**s**	z	ʃ	ʒ			((x))		((h))
Rhotic								ɾ,r						(ʁ)	
Lateral								**l**				(ʎ)			
Approximant												**j**		**w**	

=== Lexical stress ===
Word stress was rigorously predictable in Classical Latin except in a very few exceptional cases, either on the penultimate (second from last) or antepenultimate syllable (third from last), according to the syllable weight of the penultimate syllable. Stress in the Romance Languages mostly remains on the same syllable as in Latin, but various sound changes have made it no longer so predictable. Minimal pairs distinguished only by stress exist in some languages, e.g. Italian Papa [ˈpaːpa] "Pope" vs. papà [paˈpa] "dad", or Spanish límite [ˈlimite] "[a] limit", present subjunctive limite [liˈmite] "[that] [I/(s)he] limit(s)" and preterite limité [limiˈte] "[I] limited".

Erosion of unstressed syllables following the stress has caused most Spanish and Portuguese words to have either penultimate or ultimate stress: e.g. Latin trēdecim "thirteen" > Spanish trece, Portuguese treze; Latin amāre "to love" > Spanish/Portuguese amar. Most words with antepenultimate stress are learned borrowings from Latin, e.g. Spanish/Portuguese fábrica "factory" (the corresponding inherited word is Spanish fragua, Portuguese frágua "forge"). This process has gone even farther in French, with deletion of all post-stressed vowels, leading to consistent, predictable stress on the last syllable: e.g. Latin Stephanum "Stephen" > Old French Estievne > French Étienne /etjɛn/; Latin juvenis "young" > Old French juevne > French jeune /ʒœn/. This applies even to borrowings: e.g. Latin fabrica > French borrowing fabrique /fabʁik/ (the inherited word in this case being monosyllabic forge < Proto-Gallo-Romance *favrega).

Other than French (with consistent final stress), the position of the stressed syllable generally falls on one of the last three syllables. Exceptions may be caused by clitics or (in Italian) certain verb endings, e.g. Italian telefonano [teˈlɛːfonano] "they telephone"; Spanish entregándomelo [entɾeˈɣandomelo] "delivering it to me"; Italian mettiamocene [metˈtjaːmotʃene] "let's put some of it in there"; Portuguese dávamos-vo-lo [ˈdavɐmuʒvulu] "we were giving it to you". Stress on verbs is almost completely predictable in Spanish and Portuguese, but less so in Italian.

== Nominal morphology ==
Nouns, adjectives and pronouns can be marked for gender, number and case. Adjectives and pronouns must agree in all features with the noun they are bound to.

=== Number ===
The Romance languages inherited from Latin two grammatical numbers, singular and plural; the only trace of a dual number comes from Latin ambō > Spanish and Portuguese ambos, Old Romanian îmbi > Romanian ambii, Old French ambe, Italian ambo, ambedue, entrambi.

=== Gender ===
Most Romance languages have two grammatical genders, masculine and feminine. The gender of animate nouns is generally natural (i.e. nouns referring to males are generally masculine, and vice versa), but for non-animate nouns it is arbitrary, a grammatical category with no correspondence to natural gender.

Although Latin had a third gender (neuter), there is little trace of this in most languages. The biggest exception is Romanian, where there is a productive class of "neuter" nouns, which include the descendants of many Latin neuter nouns and which behave like masculines in the singular and feminines in the plural, both in the endings used and in the agreement of adjectives and pronouns (e.g. un deget "one finger" vs. două degete "two fingers", cf. Latin digitus, pl. digiti). This phenomenon is seen also in Italian with a restricted number of words (e.g. un uovo "an egg", il braccio "the arm" masculine in the singular, le uova "the eggs", le braccia "the arms" feminine in the plural). Another noteworthy exception is Asturian, which uses a neuter gender to refer to abstract, collective and uncountable entities. It appears in adjectives (la xente galbaniego "lazy people", l'agua frío "cold water", pensar escoso "fruitless thinking"), possessives (el dineru mío "my money", la sidra vueso "your cider"), one neuter article (Lo guapo ye... "The beautiful [thing] is...", Lo que cal agora ye colar "The convenient [thing] right now is to get out"), one neuter pronoun (elli/ella/ello "he/she/it") and some nouns (un pelu → el pelo "one hair → the hair", un fierru → el fierro "an iron bar → iron [material]"). The neuter gender does not admit plural forms emerging from metaphorical uses, changing to masculine or feminine (l'agua frío → les agües fríes "cold water "→ "cold waters"). Some of these neuter traces also feature in Spanish, such as ello ("it").

Such nouns arose because of the identity of the Latin neuter singular -um with the masculine singular, and the identity of the Latin neuter plural -a with the feminine singular. A similar class exists in Italian, although it is no longer productive (e.g. il dito "the finger" vs. le dita "the fingers", l'uovo "the egg" vs. le uova "the eggs"). A similar phenomenon may be observed in Albanian (which is heavily Romance-influenced), and the category remains highly productive with a number of new words loaned or coined in the neuter ((një) hotel "one hotel (m)" vs. (tri) hotele "three hotels (f)"). (A few isolated nouns in Latin had different genders in the singular and plural, but this was an unrelated phenomenon; this is similarly the case with a few French nouns, such as amour, délice, orgue.)

Spanish also has vestiges of the neuter in the demonstrative adjectives esto, eso, aquello; the pronoun ello (meaning "it"); and the article lo (used to intensify adjectives). Portuguese also has neuter demonstrative adjectives: isto, isso, aquilo (meaning "this [near me]", "this/that [near you]", "that [far from both of us]").

Remnants of the neuter, interpretable now as "a sub-class of the non-feminine gender" (Haase 2000:233), are vigorous in Italy in an area running roughly from Ancona to Matera and just north of Rome to Naples. Oppositions with masculine typically have been recategorized, so that neuter signifies the referent in general, while masculine indicates a more specific instance, with the distinction marked by the definite article. In Southeast Umbrian, for example, neuter lo pane is "the bread", while masculine lu pane refers to an individual piece or loaf of bread. Similarly, neuter lo vinu is wine in general, while masculine lu vinu is a specific sort of wine, with the consequence that mass lo vinu has no plural counterpart, but lu vinu can take a sortal plural form li vini, referring to different types of wine. Phonological forms of articles vary by locale.

=== Case ===
Latin had an extensive case system, where all nouns were declined in six cases (nominative, vocative, accusative, dative, genitive and ablative) and two numbers. Many adjectives were additionally declined in three genders, theoretically leading to a possible 6 × 2 × 3 = 36 endings per adjective. In practice, some category combinations had identical endings to other combinations, but a basic adjective like bonus "good" still had 14 distinct endings.

Spanish pronoun inflections
Case	"I"	"thou"	"oneself"	"he"	"she"	"we"		"ye"		"they"	
Nominative	yo	tú	uno	él	ella	nosotros	nosotras	vosotros	vosotras	ellos	ellas
Disjunctive	mí	ti	sí	él	ella	nosotros	nosotras	vosotros	vosotras	ellos	ellas
Accusative	me	te	se	lo	la	nos		os		los	las
Dative	me	te	se	le		nos		os		les	
Genitive	mío	tuyo	suyo	suyo; de él	suyo; de ella	nuestro		vuestro		suyo; de ellos	suyo; de ellas
Possessive	mi	tu	su			nuestro		vuestro		su	
With con	conmigo	contigo	consigo	con él	con ella	con nosotros (archaic connosco)	con nosotras (archaic connosco)	con vosotros (archaic convosco)	con vosotras (archaic convosco)	con ellos	con ellas

In all Romance languages, this system was drastically reduced. In most modern Romance languages, in fact, case is no longer marked at all on nouns, adjectives, and determiners, and most forms are derived from the Latin accusative case. Much as in English, however, case has survived somewhat better on pronouns.

Most pronouns have distinct nominative, accusative, genitive, and possessive forms (cf. English "I, me, mine, my"). Many also have a separate dative form, a disjunctive form used after prepositions and (in some languages) a special form used with the preposition con "with" (a conservative feature inherited from Latin forms such as mēcum, tēcum, nōbīscum).

Spanish inflectional classes
	"boy"	"girl"	"man"	"woman"
Singular	chico	chica	hombre	mujer
Plural	chicos	chicas	hombres	mujeres

The system of inflectional classes is also drastically reduced. The basic system is most clearly indicated in Spanish, where there are only three classes, corresponding to the first, second and third declensions in Latin: plural in -as (feminine), plural in -os (masculine), plural in -es (either masculine or feminine). The singular endings exactly track the plural, except the singular -e is dropped after certain consonants.

The same system underlies many other modern Romance languages, such as Portuguese, French and Catalan. In these languages, however, further sound changes have resulted in various irregularities. In Portuguese, for example, loss of /l/ and /n/ between vowels (with nasalization in the latter case) produces various irregular plurals (nação – nações "nation(s)"; hotel – hotéis "hotel(s)").

In French and Catalan, loss of /o/ and /e/ in most unstressed final syllables has caused the -os and -es classes to merge. In French, merger of remaining /e/ with final /a/ into [ə], and its subsequent loss, has completely obscured the original Romance system, and loss of final /s/ has caused most nouns to have identical pronunciation in singular and plural, although they are still marked differently in spelling (e.g. femme – femmes "woman – women", both pronounced /fam/).

Romanian noun inflections
Definiteness	Case	"boy"		"girl"	
Definiteness	Case	Singular	Plural	Singular	Plural
Indefinite	Nominative Accusative	băiat	băieți	fată	fete
Indefinite	Genitive Dative	băiat	băieți	fete	fete
Indefinite	Vocative	băiatule, băiete	băieților	fato (fată)	fetelor
Definite	Nominative Accusative	băiatul	băieții	fata	fetele
Definite	Genitive Dative	băiatului	băieților	fetei	fetelor

Noun inflection has survived in Romanian somewhat better than elsewhere. Determiners are still marked for two cases (nominative/accusative and genitive/dative) in both singular and plural, and feminine singular nouns have separate endings for the two cases. In addition, there is a separate vocative case, enriched with native development and Slavic borrowings (see some examples here) and the combination of noun with a following clitic definite article produces a separate set of "definite" inflections for nouns.

The inflectional classes of Latin have also survived more in Romanian than elsewhere, e.g. om – oameni "man – men" (Latin homo – homines); corp – corpuri "body – bodies" (Latin corpus – corpora). (Many other exceptional forms, however, are due to later sound changes or analogy, e.g. casă – case "house(s)" vs. lună – luni' "moon(s)"; frate – fraţi "brother(s)" vs. carte – cărţi "book(s)" vs. vale – văi "valley(s)".)

In Italian, the situation is intermediate between Spanish and Romanian. There are no case endings and relatively few classes, as in Spanish, but noun endings are generally formed with vowels instead of /s/, as in Romanian: amico – amici "friend(s) (masc.)", amica – amiche "friend(s) (fem.)"; cane – cani "dog(s)". The masculine plural amici is thought to reflect the Latin nominative plural -ī rather than accusative plural -ōs (Spanish -os); however, the other plurals are thought to stem from special developments of Latin -ās and -ēs.

Evolution of case in various Romance languages (Latin bonus "good")
	Case	Latin	Spanish	Old French	Old Sursilvan	Romanian
Masculine singular	Nominative	bonus	bueno	buens	buns	bun
Masculine singular	Vocative	bone	bueno	buens	buns	bun
Masculine singular	Accusative	bonum	bueno	buen	biVn	bun
Masculine singular	Genitive	bonī	bueno	buen	biVn	bun
Masculine singular	Dative	bonō	bueno	buen	biVn	bun
Masculine singular	Ablative	bonō	bueno	buen	biVn	bun
Masculine plural	Nominative	bonī	buenos	buen	biVni	buni
Masculine plural	Vocative	bonī	buenos	buen	biVni	buni
Masculine plural	Accusative	bonōs	buenos	buens	buns	buni
Masculine plural	Genitive	bonōrum	buenos	buens	buns	buni
Masculine plural	Dative	bonīs	buenos	buens	buns	buni
Masculine plural	Ablative	bonīs	buenos	buens	buns	buni
Feminine singular	Nominative	bona	buena	buene	buna	bună
Feminine singular	Vocative	bona	buena	buene	buna	bună
Feminine singular	Accusative	bonam	buena	buene	buna	bună
Feminine singular	Genitive	bonae	buena	buene	buna	bune
Feminine singular	Dative	bonae	buena	buene	buna	bune
Feminine singular	Ablative	bonā	buena	buene	buna	bune
Feminine plural	Nominative	bonae	buenas	buenes	bunas	bune
Feminine plural	Vocative	bonae	buenas	buenes	bunas	bune
Feminine plural	Accusative	bonās	buenas	buenes	bunas	bune
Feminine plural	Genitive	bonārum	buenas	buenes	bunas	bune
Feminine plural	Dative	bonīs	buenas	buenes	bunas	bune
Feminine plural	Ablative	bonīs	buenas	buenes	bunas	bune

A different type of noun inflection survived into the medieval period in a number of western Romance languages (Old French, Old Occitan and the older forms of a number of Rhaeto-Romance languages). This inflection distinguished nominative from oblique, grouping the accusative case with the oblique, rather than with the nominative as in Romanian.

The oblique case in these languages generally inherits from the Latin accusative; as a result, masculine nouns have distinct endings in the two cases while most feminine nouns do not.

A number of different inflectional classes are still represented at this stage. For example, the difference in the nominative case between masculine li voisins "the neighbor" and li pere "the father", and between feminine la riens "the thing" and la fame "the woman", faithfully reflects the corresponding Latin inflectional differences (vicīnus vs. pater, fēmina vs. rēs).

A number of synchronically quite irregular differences between nominative and oblique reflect direct inheritances of Latin third-declension nouns with two different stems (one for the nominative singular, one for all other forms), most of which had a stress shift between nominative and the other forms: li ber – le baron "baron" (barō – barōnem); la suer – la seror "sister" (soror – sorōrem); li prestre – le prevoire "priest" (presbyter – presbyterem); li sire – le seigneur "lord" (senior – seniōrem); li enfes – l'enfant "child" (infāns – infantem).

A few of these multi-stem nouns derive from Latin forms without stress shift, e.g. li om – le ome "man" (homō – hominem). All of these multi-stem nouns refer to people; other nouns with stress shift in Latin (e.g. amor – amōrem "love") have not survived. Some of the same nouns with multiple stems in Old French or Old Occitan have come down in Italian in the nominative rather than the accusative (e.g. uomo "man" < homō, moglie "wife" < mulier), suggesting that a similar system existed in pre-literary Italian.

The modern situation in Sursilvan (one of the Rhaeto-Romance languages) is unique in that the original nominative/oblique distinction has been reinterpreted as a predicative/attributive distinction:

- il hotel ej vɛɲiws natsionalizaws "the hotel has been nationalized"
- il hotel natsionalizaw "the nationalized hotel"

== Pronouns, determiners ==
As described above, case marking on pronouns is much more extensive than for nouns. Determiners (e.g. words such as "a", "the", "this") are also marked for case in Romanian.

Most Romance languages have the following sets of pronouns and determiners:

- Personal pronouns, in three persons and two genders.
- A reflexive pronoun, used when the object is the same as the subject. This approximately corresponds to English "-self", but separate forms exist only in the third person, with no number marking.
- Definite and indefinite articles, and in some languages, a partitive article that expresses the concept of "some".
- A two- or three-way distinction among demonstratives. Some languages (particularly those spoken in the Iberian peninsula) have a three-way distinction of distance (near me, near you, near him) which, though not paralleled in current English, used to be present as "this/that/yon".
- Relative pronouns and interrogatives, with the same forms used for both (similar to English "who" and "which").
- Various indefinite pronouns and determiners (e.g. Spanish algún "some", alguien "someone", algo "something"; ningún "no", nadie "no one"; todo "every"; cada "each"; mucho "much/many/a lot", poco "few/little"; otro "other/another").

=== Personal pronouns ===
Unlike in English, a separate neuter personal pronoun ("it") generally does not exist, but the third-person singular and plural both distinguish masculine from feminine. Also, as described above, case is marked on pronouns even though it is not usually on nouns, similar to English. As in English, there are forms for nominative case (subject pronouns), oblique case (object pronouns), and genitive case (possessive pronouns); in addition, third-person pronouns distinguish accusative and dative. There is also an additional set of possessive determiners, distinct from the genitive case of the personal pronoun; this corresponds to the English difference between "my, your" and "mine, yours".

==== Development from Latin ====
The Romance languages do not retain the Latin third-person personal pronouns, but have innovated a separate set of third-person pronouns by borrowing the demonstrative ille ("that (over there)"), and creating a separate reinforced demonstrative by attaching a variant of ecce "behold!" (or "here is ...") to the pronoun.

Similarly, in place of the genitive of the Latin pronouns, most Romance languages adopted the reflexive possessive, which then serves indifferently as both reflexive and non-reflexive possessive. Note that the reflexive, and hence the third-person possessive, is unmarked for the gender of the person being referred to. Hence, although gendered possessive forms do exist—e.g., Portuguese seu (masc.) vs. sua (fem.)—these refer to the gender of the object possessed, not the possessor.

The gender of the possessor can be made clear by a collocation such as French la voiture à lui/elle, Portuguese o carro dele/dela, literally "the car of him/her". (In spoken Brazilian Portuguese, these collocations are the usual way of expressing the third-person possessive, since the former possessive seu carro now has the meaning "your car".)

The same demonstrative ille is the source of the definite article in most Romance languages (see below), which explains any similarity in form between personal pronoun and definite article. When the two are different, it is usually because of differing degrees of phonological reduction. Generally, the personal pronoun is unreduced (beyond normal sound change), while the article has undergone various degrees of reduction, beginning with loss of one of the two original syllables, e.g. Spanish ella "she" < illa vs. la "the (fem.)" < -la < illa, or masculine el, developed from il- < illud.

==== Clitic pronouns ====
Object pronouns in Latin were normal words, but in the Romance languages they have become clitic forms, which must stand adjacent to a verb and merge phonologically with it. Originally, object pronouns could come either before or after the verb; sound change would often produce different forms in these two cases, with numerous additional complications and contracted forms when multiple clitic pronouns cooccurred.

Catalan still largely maintains this system with a highly complex clitic pronoun system. Most languages, however, have simplified this system by undoing some of the clitic mergers and requiring clitics to stand in a particular position relative to the verb (usually after imperatives, before other finite forms, and either before or after non-finite forms depending on the language).

When a pronoun cannot serve as a clitic, a separate disjunctive form is used. These result from dative object pronouns pronounced with stress (which causes them to develop differently from the equivalent unstressed pronouns) or from subject pronouns.

Most Romance languages are null-subject languages. The subject pronouns are used only for emphasis and take the stress, and as a result are not clitics. In French, however (as in Friulian and in some Gallo-Italian languages of northern Italy), verbal agreement marking has degraded to the point that subject pronouns have become mandatory, and have turned into clitics. These forms cannot be stressed, so for emphasis the disjunctive pronouns must be used in combination with the clitic subject forms. Friulian and the Gallo-Italian languages have actually gone further than this and merged the subject pronouns onto the verb as a new type of verb agreement marking, which must be present even when there is a subject noun phrase. (Some non-standard varieties of French treat disjunctive pronouns as arguments and clitic pronouns as agreement markers.)

==== Familiar–formal distinction ====
In medieval times, most Romance languages developed a distinction between familiar and polite second-person pronouns (a so-called T–V distinction), similar to the former English distinction between familiar "thou" and polite "you". This distinction was determined by the relationship between the speakers. As in English, this generally developed by appropriating the plural second-person pronoun to serve in addition as a polite singular. French is still at this stage, with familiar singular tu vs. formal or plural vous. In cases like this, the pronoun requires plural agreement in all cases whenever a single affix marks both person and number (as in verb agreement endings and object and possessive pronouns), but singular agreement elsewhere where appropriate (e.g. vous-même "yourself" vs. vous-mêmes "yourselves").

Many languages, however, innovated further in developing an even more polite pronoun, generally composed of some noun phrases (e.g. Portuguese vossa mercê "your mercy", progressively reduced to vossemecê, vosmecê and finally você) and taking third-person singular agreement. A plural equivalent was created at the same time or soon after (Portuguese vossas mercês, reduced to vocês), taking third-person plural agreement. Spanish innovated similarly, with usted(es) from earlier vuestra(s) merced(es).

In Portuguese and Spanish (as in other languages with similar forms), the "extra-polite" forms in time came to be the normal polite forms, and the former polite (or plural) second-person vos was displaced to a familiar form, either becoming a familiar plural (as in European Spanish) or a familiar singular (as in many varieties of Latin American Spanish). In the latter case, it either competes with the original familiar singular tú (as in Guatemala), displaces it entirely (as in Argentina), or is itself displaced (as in Mexico, except in Chiapas). In the Spanish of the Americas, the gap created by the loss of familiar plural vos was filled by originally polite ustedes, with the result that there is no familiar/polite distinction in the plural, just as in the original tú/vos system.

A similar path was followed by Italian and Romanian. Romanian uses dumneavoastră "your lordship", while in Italian the former polite phrase sua eccellenza "your excellency" has simply been supplanted by the corresponding pronoun Ella or Lei (literally "she", but capitalized when meaning "you"). As in European Spanish, the original second-person plural voi serves as familiar plural. (In Italy, during fascist times leading up to World War II, voi was resurrected as a polite singular, and discarded again afterwards, although it remains in some southern dialects.)

Portuguese innovated again in developing a new extra-polite pronoun o senhor "the sir", which in turn downgraded você. Hence, modern European Portuguese has a three-way distinction between "familiar" tu, "equalizing" você and "polite" o senhor. (The original second-person plural vós was discarded centuries ago in speech, and is used today only in translations of the Bible, where tu and vós serve as universal singular and plural pronouns, respectively.)

Brazilian Portuguese, however, has diverged from this system, and most dialects simply use você (and plural vocês) as a general-purpose second-person pronoun, combined with te (from tu) as the clitic object pronoun. The form o senhor (and feminine a senhora) is sometimes used in speech, but only in situations where an English speaker would say "sir" or "ma'am". The result is that second-person verb forms have disappeared, and the whole pronoun system has been radically realigned. However that is the case only in the spoken language of central and northern Brazil, with the northeastern and southern areas of the country still largely preserving the second-person verb form and the tu/você distinction.

Catalan still retains the plural form vós for formal distinction (similarly to French) but it is falling out of use, and nowadays is usually seen only in extremely formal circumstances or in writing. Instead, vostè (Central) or vosté (Valencian) is normally used orally, which functions just like Spanish and Portuguese usted/você.

=== Articles ===
Latin had no articles as such. The closest definite article was the non-specific demonstrative is, ea, id meaning approximately "this/that/the". The closest indefinite articles were the indefinite determiners aliquī, aliqua, aliquod "some (non-specific)" and certus "a certain".

Romance languages have both indefinite and definite articles, but none of the above words form the basis for either of these. Usually the definite article is derived from the Latin demonstrative ille "that", but some languages (e.g. Sardinian, Old Occitan and Balearic Catalan) have forms from ipse (emphatic, as in "I myself"). The indefinite article everywhere is derived from the number ūnus "one".

Some languages, e.g. French and Italian, have a partitive article that approximately translates as "some". This is used either with mass nouns or with plural nouns—both cases where the indefinite article cannot occur. A partitive article is used (and in French, required) whenever a bare noun refers to a specific (but unspecified or unknown) quantity of the noun, but not when a bare noun refers to a class in general. For example, the partitive would be used in both of the following sentences:

- I want milk.
- Men arrived today.

But neither of these:

- Milk is good for you.
- I hate men.

The sentence "Men arrived today", however, (presumably) means "some specific men arrived today" rather than "men, as a general class, arrived today" (which would mean that there were no men before today). On the other hand, "I hate men" does mean "I hate men, as a general class" rather than "I hate some specific men".

As in many other matters of historical linguistics, French has developed the farthest from Latin in its use of articles. In French, nearly all nouns, singular and plural, must be accompanied by an article (either indefinite, definite or partitive) or demonstrative pronoun.

Due to pervasive sound changes in French, most nouns are pronounced identically in the singular and plural, and there is often heavy homophony between nouns and identically pronounced words of other classes. For example, all of the following are pronounced /sɛ̃/: sain "healthy"; saint "saint, holy"; sein "breast"; ceins "(you) tie around, gird"; ceint "(he) ties around, girds"; ceint "tied around, girded"; and the equivalent noun and adjective plural forms sains, saints, seins, ceints. The article helps identify the noun forms saint or sein and distinguish singular from plural; likewise, the mandatory subject of verbs helps identify the verb ceint. In more conservative Romance languages, neither articles nor subject pronouns are necessary, since all of the above words are pronounced differently. In Italian, for example, the equivalents are sano, santo, seno, cingi, cinge, cinto, sani, santi, seni, cinti, where all vowels and consonants are pronounced as written, and ⟨s⟩ /s/ and ⟨c⟩ /tʃ/ are clearly distinct from each other.

Latin, at least originally, had a three-way distinction among demonstrative pronouns distinguished by distal value: hic "this", iste "that (near you)", ille "that (over there)", similar to the distinction that used to exist in English as "this" vs. "that" vs. "yon(der)". In urban Latin of Rome, iste came to have a specifically derogatory meaning, but this innovation apparently did not reach the provinces and is not reflected in the modern Romance languages. A number of these languages still have such a three-way distinction, although hic has been lost and the other pronouns have shifted somewhat in meaning. For example, Spanish has este "this" vs. ese "that (near you)" vs. aquel (fem. aquella) "that (over yonder)". The Spanish pronouns derive, respectively, from Latin iste, ipse and accu-ille, where accu- is an emphatic prefix derived from eccum "behold (it!)" (still vigorous in Italy as Ecco! "Behold!"), possibly with influence from atque "and".

Reinforced demonstratives such as accu-ille arose as ille came to be used as an article as well as a demonstrative. Such forms were often created even when not strictly needed to distinguish otherwise ambiguous forms. Italian, for example, has both questo "this" (eccu-istum) and quello "that" (eccu-illum), in addition to dialectal codesto "that (near you)" (*eccu-tē-istum). French generally prefers forms derived from bare ecce "behold", as in the pronoun ce "this one/that one" (earlier ço, from ecce-hoc; cf. Italian ciò 'that') and the determiner ce/cet "this/that" (earlier cest, from ecce-istum).

Reinforced forms are likewise common in locative adverbs (words such as English here and there), based on related Latin forms such as hic "this" vs. hīc "here", hāc "this way", and ille "that" vs. illīc "there", illāc "that way". Here again French prefers bare ecce while Spanish and Italian prefer eccum (French ici "here" vs. Spanish aquí, Italian qui). In western languages such as Spanish, Portuguese and Catalan, doublets and triplets arose such as Portuguese aqui, acá, cá "(to) here" (accu-hīc, accu-hāc, accu-hāc). From these, a prefix a- was extracted, from which forms like aí "there (near you)" (a-(i)bi) and ali "there (over yonder)" (a-(i)llīc) were created; compare Catalan neuter pronouns açò (acce-hoc) "this", això (a-(i)psum-hoc) "that (near you)", allò (a-(i)llum-hoc) "that (yonder)".

Subsequent changes often reduced the number of demonstrative distinctions. Standard Italian, for example, has only a two-way distinction "this" vs. "that", as in English, with second-person and third-person demonstratives combined. In Catalan, however, a former three-way distinction aquest, aqueix, aquell has been reduced differently, with first-person and second-person demonstratives combined. Hence aquest means either "this" or "that (near you)"; on the phone, aquest is used to refer both to speaker and addressee.

Old French had a similar distinction to Italian (cist/cest vs. cil/cel), both of which could function as either adjectives or pronouns. Modern French, however, has no distinction between "this" and "that": ce/cet, cette < cest, ceste is only an adjective, and celui, celle < cel lui, celle is only a pronoun, and both forms indifferently mean either "this" or "that". (The distinction between "this" and "that" can be made, if necessary, by adding the suffixes -ci "here" or -là "there", e.g. cette femme-ci "this woman" vs. cette femme-là "that woman", but this is rarely done except when specifically necessary to distinguish two entities from each other.)

== Verbal morphology ==
Correspondence between Latin and Romance tenses
Latin	Galician- Portuguese	Spanish	Catalan	Occitan	French	Rhaeto-Romance	Italian	Romanian	Sardinian
Present indicative	Present indicative								
Present subjunctive	Present subjunctive								
Imperfect indicative	Imperfect indicative								
Imperfect subjunctive	Personal infinitive	—	—	—	—	—	—	—	Imperfect subjunctive / Personal infinitive
Future indicative	—	eres ("you are")	—	—	future of "to be" in Old French	—	—	3rd person plural Imperfect indicative	—
Perfect indicative	Preterite		Simple preterite (literary except in some Valencian dialects)	Preterite	Simple past (literary)	—	Preterite (Regional Italian in Tuscany); Literary Remote Past (Regional Italian in the North); Preterite/Perfect (Regional Italian in the South)	Simple past (literary except in the Oltenian dialect)	In Old Sardinian; only traces in modern lang
Perfect subjunctive	—								
Pluperfect indicative	Pluperfect	Imperfect subjunctive (-ra form)	—	Second conditional in Old Occitan	Second preterite in very early Old French (Sequence of Saint Eulalia)	—	—	1st, 2nd and 3d person plural of the Simple past	—
Pluperfect subjunctive	Imperfect subjunctive							Pluperfect indicative	—
Future perfect	Future subjunctive (very much in use)	Future subjunctive (moribund)	—	possible traces of future subjunctive in Old Occitan	—	—	possible traces of future subjunctive in Old Italian	Conditional in Old Romanian (until 17th cent.)	—
New future	infinitive+habĕo							volo+infinitive	habĕo+infinitive
New conditional	infinitive+habēbam					infinitive+habuisset	infinitive+habuit	habĕo+infinitive (split apart from infinitive+habĕo in 18th-century Romanian)	debēbam+infinitive / habēbam+infinitive
Preterite vs. present perfect (in speech)	preterite only	both	both (but usually an analytic preterite vado+infinitive is used)	?	present perfect only	present perfect only	both (Regional Italian in Tuscany); present perfect only (Regional Italian in the North and in Sardinia); preference for preterite (Regional Italian in the South)	present perfect only	present perfect only

Verbs have many conjugations, including, in most languages:

- A present tense, a preterite, an imperfect, a pluperfect, a future tense and a future perfect in the indicative mood, for statements of fact.
- Present and preterite subjunctive tenses, for hypothetical or uncertain conditions. Several languages (for example, Italian, Portuguese and Spanish) have also imperfect and pluperfect subjunctives, although it is not unusual to have just one subjunctive equivalent for preterit and imperfect (e.g. no unique subjunctive equivalent in Italian of the so-called passato remoto). Portuguese and Spanish also have future and future perfect subjunctives, which have no equivalent in Latin.
- An imperative mood, for direct commands.
- Three non-finite forms: infinitive, gerund and past participle.
- Distinct active and passive voices, as well as an impersonal passive voice.
- Note that, although these categories are largely inherited from Classical Latin, many of the forms are either newly constructed or inherited from different categories (e.g. the Romance imperfect subjunctive most commonly is derived from the Latin pluperfect subjunctive, while the Romance pluperfect subjunctive is derived from a new present perfect tense with the auxiliary verb placed in the imperfect subjunctive).

Several tenses and aspects, especially of the indicative mood, have been preserved with little change in most languages, as shown in the following table for the Latin verb dīcere (to say), and its descendants.

	Infinitive	Indicative			Subjunctive	Imperative
	Infinitive	Present	Preterite	Imperfect	Present	Present
Latin	dīcere	dīcit	dīxit	dicēbat	dīcat/dīcet	dīc
Aragonese	dicir	diz	dició	deciba/diciba	diga	diz
Asturian	dicir	diz	dixo	dicía	diga	di
Catalan	dir	diu/dit	digué/va dir/dit	deia	digui/diga	digues
Corsican	dì	dice/dici	disse/dissi	dicia	dica/dichi	dì
Emilian	dîr	dîs	l'à détt/dgé	dgeva	dégga	dì
Franco-Provençal	dire	di	dè	djéve	dijisse/dzéze	dète
French	dire^{1}	dit	dit/a dit	disait	dise	dis
Galician	dicir	di	dixo	dicía	diga	di
Italian	di(ce)re	dice	disse	diceva	dica	di'
Judaeo-Spanish (Ladino)	dezir דֵיזִיר	dize דִיזֵי	dixo דִישוֹ	dezía דֵיזִייָה	diga דִיגה	dize, diz, di דִיזֵי, דִיז, דִי
Leonese	dicire	diz	dixu	dicía	diga	di
Lombard	dì	dis	ha dii	diseva	disa	dì
Mirandese	dir	diś	à dit	dgiva	diga	dì
Neapolitan	dicere	dice	dicette	diceva	diche	dije
Occitan	díser/dire	ditz	diguèt	disiá	diga	diga
Picard	dire	dit	–	disoait	diche	–
Piedmontese	dì	dis	dìsser^{2}, l'ha dit	disìa	disa	dis
Portuguese	dizer	diz	disse	dizia	diga	diz^{3}
Romanian	a zice, zicere^{4}	zice	zise/a zis	zicea	zică	zi
Romansh	dir	di	ha ditg	discheva^{5}	dia	di
Sicilian	dìciri	dici	dissi	dicìa	dica^{6}	dici
Spanish	decir	dice	dijo	decía	diga	di
Venetian	dir	dise	–	disea	diga	dì/disi
Walloon	dire	dit	a dit	dijheut	dixhe	di
Basic meaning	to say	he says	he said	he was saying	he says	say [thou]

^{1}The spelling is conservative. Note the pronunciations: dire /diʁ/, dit /di/, disait /dizɛ/, dise /diz/, dis /di/.
^{2}Until the eighteenth century.
^{3}With the disused variant dize.
^{4}long infinitive
^{5}In modern times, scheva.
^{6}Sicilian now uses imperfect subjunctive dicissi in place of present subjunctive.

The main tense and mood distinctions that were made in Classical Latin are generally still present in the modern Romance languages, though many are now expressed through compound rather than simple verbs. The passive voice, which was mostly synthetic in Classical Latin, has been completely replaced with compound forms.

- Owing to sound changes which made it homophonous with the preterite, the Latin future indicative tense was dropped and replaced with a periphrasis of the form infinitive + present tense of habēre (to have). Eventually, this structure was reanalysed as a new future tense.
- In a similar process, an entirely new conditional form was created.
- While the synthetic passive voice of Classical Latin was abandoned in favour of periphrastic constructions, most of the active voice remained in use. However, several tenses have changed meaning, especially subjunctives. For example:
  - The Latin pluperfect indicative became a conditional in Sicilian, and an imperfect subjunctive in Spanish.
  - The Latin pluperfect subjunctive developed into an imperfect subjunctive in all languages except Romansh, where it became a conditional, and Romanian, where it became a pluperfect indicative.
  - The Latin preterite subjunctive, together with the future perfect indicative, became a future subjunctive in Old Spanish and Galician-Portuguese.
  - The Latin imperfect subjunctive became a personal infinitive in Galician-Portuguese.
- Many Romance languages have two verbs "to be". One is derived from Vulgar Latin *essere < Latin esse "to be" with an admixture of forms derived from sedēre "to sit", and is used mostly for essential attributes; the other is derived from stāre "to stand", and mostly used for temporary states. This development is most notable in Spanish, Portuguese and Catalan. In French, Italian and Romanian, the derivative of stāre largely preserved an earlier meaning of "to stand/to stay", although in modern Italian, stare is used in a few constructions where English would use "to be", as in sto bene "I am well". In Old French, the derivatives of *essere and stāre were estre and ester, respectively. In modern French, estre persists as être "to be" while ester has been lost as a separate verb; but the former imperfect of ester is used as the modern imperfect of être (e.g. il était "he was"), replacing the irregular forms derived from Latin (e.g. ere(t), iere(t) < erat). In Italian, the two verbs share the same past participle, stato. sedēre persists most notably in the future of *essere (e.g. Spanish/Portuguese/French/etc. ser-, Italian sar-), although in Old French the future is a direct derivation from Latin, e.g. (i)ert "he will be" < erit. See Romance copula for further information.

For a more detailed illustration of how the verbs have changed with respect to Classical Latin, see Romance verbs.

- During the Renaissance, Italian, Portuguese, Spanish and a few other Romance languages developed a progressive aspect which did not exist in Latin. In French, progressive constructions remain very limited, the imperfect generally being preferred, as in Latin.
- Many Romance languages now have a verbal construction analogous to the present perfect of English. In some, it has taken the place of the old preterite (at least in the vernacular); in others, the two coexist with somewhat different meanings (cf. English I did vs. I have done). A few examples:
  - preterite only: Galician-Portuguese, Asturleonese, Sicilian and some dialects of Spanish;
  - preterite and present perfect: Catalan, Occitan, standard Spanish and Tuscan/standard Italian;
  - present perfect predominant, preterite now literary: French, Romanian, several Italian dialects and some dialects of Spanish;
  - present perfect only: Romansh

Note that in Catalan, the synthetic preterite is predominantly a literary tense, except in Valencian; but an analytic preterite (formed using an auxiliary vadō, which in other languages signals the future) persists in speech, with the same meaning. In Portuguese, a morphological present perfect does exist but has a different meaning (closer to "I have been doing").

The following are common features of the Romance languages (inherited from Vulgar Latin) that are different from Classical Latin:

- Adjectives generally follow the noun they modify.
- The normal clause structure is SVO, rather than SOV, and is much less flexible than in Latin.
- Many Latin constructions involving nominalized verbal forms (e.g. the use of accusative plus infinitive in indirect discourse and the use of the ablative absolute) were dropped in favor of constructions with subordinate clause. Exceptions can be found in Italian, for example, Latin tempore permittente > Italian tempo permettendo; L. hōc factō > I. ciò fatto.

== Lexicon ==
=== Loanwords ===
Romance languages have borrowed heavily, though mostly from other Romance languages. However, some, such as Spanish, Portuguese, Romanian and French, have borrowed heavily from other language groups. Vulgar Latin borrowed first from indigenous languages of the Roman empire, and during the Germanic folk movements, from Germanic languages, especially Gothic; for Eastern Romance languages, during the Bulgarian Empires, from Slavic languages, especially Bulgarian. Notable examples are *blancus "white", replacing native albus (but Romansh alv, Dalmatian jualb, Romanian alb); *guerra "war", replacing native bellum; and the words for the cardinal directions, where cognates of English "north", "south", "east" and "west" replaced the native words septentriō, merīdiēs (also "noon; midday nap"; cf. Romanian meriză), oriens, and occidens. (See History of French – The Franks.) Some Celtic words were incorporated into the core vocabulary, partly for words with no Latin equivalent (betulla "birch", camisia "shirt", cerevisia "beer"), but in some cases replacing Latin vocabulary (gladius "sword", replacing ensis; cambiāre "to exchange", replacing mūtāre except in Romanian and Portuguese; carrus "cart", replacing currus; pettia "piece", largely displacing pars (later resurrected) and eliminating frustum). Many Greek loans also entered the lexicon, e.g. spatha "sword" (Greek: σπάθη spáthē, replacing gladius which shifted to "iris", cf. French épée, Spanish espada, Italian spada and Romanian spată); cara "face" (Greek: κάρα kára, partly replacing faciēs); colpe "blow" (Greek: κόλαφος kólaphos, replacing ictus, cf. Spanish golpe, French coup); cata "each" (Greek: κατά katá, replacing quisque); common suffixes *-ijāre/-izāre (Greek: -ίζειν -izein, French -oyer/-iser, Spanish -ear/-izar, Italian -eggiare/-izzare, etc.), -ista (Greek: -ιστής -istes).

=== Lexical innovation ===
Many basic nouns and verbs, especially those that were short or had irregular morphology, were replaced by longer derived forms with regular morphology. Nouns, and sometimes adjectives, were often replaced by diminutives, e.g. auris "ear" > auricula (orig. "outer ear") > oricla (Sardinian origra, Italian orecchia/o, Portuguese orelha, etc.); avis "bird" > avicellus (orig. "chick, nestling") > aucellu (Occitan aucèl, Friulian ucel, Neapolitan auciello, etc.); caput "head" > capitium (Portuguese cabeça, Spanish cabeza, French chevet "headboard"; but reflexes of caput were retained also, sometimes without change of meaning, as in Italian capo "head", alongside testa); vetus "old" > vetulus > veclus (Dalmatian vieklo, Italian vecchio, Portuguese velho, etc.). Sometimes augmentative constructions were used instead: piscis "fish" > Old French peis > peisson (orig. "big fish") > French poisson. Verbs were often replaced by frequentative constructions: canere "to sing" > cantāre; iacere "to throw" > iactāre > *iectāre (Italian gettare, Portuguese jeitar, Spanish echar, etc.); iuvāre > adiūtāre (Italian aiutare, Spanish ayudar, French aider, etc., meaning "help", alongside e.g. iuvāre > Italian giovare' "to be of use"); vēnārī "hunt" (Romanian vâna, Aromanian avinari) > replaced by *captiāre "to hunt", frequentative of capere "to seize" (Italian cacciare, Portuguese caçar, Romansh catschar, French chasser, etc.).

Many Classical Latin words became archaic or poetic and were replaced by more colloquial terms: equus "horse" > caballus (orig. "nag") (but equa "mare" remains, cf. Spanish yegua, Portuguese égua, Sardinian ebba, Romanian iapă); domus "house" > casa (orig. "hut"); ignis "fire" > focus (orig. "hearth"); strāta "street" > rūga (orig. "furrow") or callis (orig. "footpath") (but strāta is continued in Italian strada). In some cases, terms from common occupations became generalized: invenīre "to find" replaced by afflāre (orig. "to sniff out", in hunting, cf. Spanish hallar, Portuguese achar, Romansh dial. anflar, Southern Italian asciare, acchiare, Romanian afla 'to find out'); advenīre "to arrive" gave way to plicāre (orig. "to fold (sails; tents)", cf. Spanish llegar, Portuguese chegar; Romanian pleca), elsewhere arripāre (orig. "to harbor at a riverbank", cf. Italian arrivare, French arriver) (advenīre is continued with the meaning "to achieve, manage to do" as in Middle French aveindre, or "to happen" in Italian avvenire). The same thing sometimes happened to religious terms, due to the pervasive influence of Christianity: loquī "to speak" succumbed to parabolāre (orig. "to tell parables", cf. Occitan parlar, French parler, Italian parlare) or fabulārī ~ fābellāre (orig. "to tell stories", cf. Spanish hablar, Dalmatian favlur, Sardinian faeddare), based on Jesus' way of speaking in parables.

Many prepositions were used as verbal particles to make new roots and verb stems, e.g., Italian estrarre, Aromanian astragu, astradziri "to extract" from Latin ex- "out of" and trahere "to pull" (Italian trarre "draw, pull", Aromanian tragu, tradziri), or to augment already existing words, e.g. French coudre, Italian cucire, Portuguese coser "to sew", from cōnsuere "to sew up", from suere "to sew", with total loss of the bare stem. Many prepositions and commonly became compounded, e.g., de ex > French dès "as of", ab ante > Italian avanti "forward". Some words derived from phrases, e.g. Portuguese agora, Spanish ahora "now" < hāc hōrā "at this hour"; French avec "with" (prep.) < Old French avuec (adv.) < apud hoc "with that"; Spanish tamaño, Portuguese tamanho "size" < tam magnum "so big"; Italian codesto "this, that" (near you) < Old Italian cotevesto < eccum tibi istum approx. "here's that thing of yours"; Portuguese você "you" < vosmecê < vossemecê < Galician-Portuguese vossa mercee "your mercy".

A number of common Latin words that have disappeared in many or most Romance languages have survived either in the periphery or in remote corners (especially Sardinia and Romania), or as secondary terms, sometimes differing in meaning. For example, Latin caseum "cheese" in the periphery (Portuguese queijo, Spanish queso, Romansh caschiel, Sardinian càsu, Romanian caş), but in the central areas has been replaced by formāticum, originally "moulded (cheese)" (French fromage, Occitan/Catalan formatge, Italian formaggio, with, however, cacio also available in much of Italy; similarly (com)edere "to eat (up)", which survives as Spanish/Portuguese comer but elsewhere is replaced by mandūcāre, originally "to chew" (French manger, Sardinian mandicare alongside pappare, Romanian mânca(re)). In some cases, one language happens to preserve a word displaced elsewhere, e.g. Italian ogni "each, every" < omnes, displaced elsewhere by tōtum, originally "whole" or by a reflex of Greek κατά (e.g. Italian ognuno, Catalan tothom "everyone"; Italian ogni giorno, Spanish cada día "every day"); Friulian vaî "to cry" < flēre "to weep"; Serbo-Croatian (Dubrovnik) otijemna "sail pole" < Dalmatian < antenna "yardarm". Sardinian in particular preserves many words entirely lost elsewhere, e.g. eja "yes" < etiam "also/yes/indeed", emmo "yes" < immo "rather/yes/no", mannu "big" < magnus, nàrrere "to say" < narrāre "to tell", and domo "house" < (abl.) domō "at home". Sardinian preserves some words that were already archaic in Classical Latin, e.g. àchina "grape" < acinam, while Sicily and Calabria typically have forms with initial /r/: ràcina.

=== Latinisms ===
During the Middle Ages, scores of words were borrowed directly from Classical Latin (so-called Latinisms), either in their original form (learned loans) or in a somewhat nativized form (semi-learned loans). These resulted in many doublets—pairs of inherited and learned words—such as those in the table below:

Doublets in Romance languages
Latin	Romance	Inherited	Latinism
fragilis "fragile"	French	frêle "frail"	fragile "fragile"
fabrica "craft, manufacture"	French	forge "forge"	fabrique "factory"
fabrica	Spanish	fragua "forge"	fábrica "factory"
fabrica	Romanian	făură "blacksmith (archaic)"	fabrică "factory"
lēgālis "legal"	French	loyal "loyal"	légal "legal"
lēgālis	Spanish	leal "loyal"	legal "legal"
advōcātus "advocate (noun)"	French	avoué "solicitor (attorney)"	avocat "barrister (attorney)"
polīre "to polish"	Portuguese	puir "to wear thin"	polir "to polish"
locālis "place"	Portuguese	lugar "place"	local "place"
fabricō, fabricare "to forge"	Romanian	fereca "to fetter, hoop"	fabrica "to produce, fabricate"
fābula "fable"	Romanian	faulă "appearance, look"	fabulă "fable"
gravitās, gravitātem "weight"	Romanian	greutate "weight, difficulty"	gravitate "gravity"

Sometimes triplets arise: Latin articulus "joint" > Portuguese artículo "joint, knuckle" (learned), artigo "article" (semi-learned), artelho "ankle" (inherited; archaic and dialectal). In many cases, the learned word simply displaced the original popular word: e.g. Spanish crudo "crude, raw" (Old Spanish cruo); French légume "vegetable" (Old French leüm); Portuguese flor "flower" (Galician-Portuguese chor). The learned loan always sounds (and, in writing, looks) more like the original than the inherited word does, because regular sound change has been bypassed; likewise, the learned word usually has a meaning closer to that of the original. In French, the stress of the modern form of the learned loan may be on the "wrong" syllable vis-à-vis Latin, whereas the stress of the inherited word always corresponds to the Latin stress: e.g. Latin vipera (stress on /i/) vs. French vipère, learned loan, and guivre/vouivre, inherited.

Borrowing from Classical Latin has produced a large number of suffix doublets. Examples from Spanish (learned form first): -ción vs. -zon; -cia vs. -za; -ificar vs. -iguar; -izar vs. -ear; -mento vs. -miento; -tud (< nominative -tūdō) vs. -dumbre (< accusative -tūdine); -ículo vs. -ejo; etc. Similar examples can be found in all the other Romance languages.

This borrowing also introduced large numbers of classical prefixes in their original form (dis-, ex-, post-, trans-) and reinforced many others (re-, popular Spanish/Portuguese des- < dis-, popular French dé- < dis-, popular Italian s- < ex-). Many Greek prefixes and suffixes (hellenisms) also found their way into the lexicon: tele-, poli-/poly-, meta-, pseudo-, -scope/scopo, -logie/logia/logía, etc.

== See also ==
- Palatalization in the Romance languages
- Phonological changes from Classical Latin to Proto-Romance
- Proto-Romance language
