= Subjunctive mood in Spanish =

Spanish grammar

The subjunctive is one of the three (or five) (Note: Grammarians have differing opinions on the number of the moods present in the language; it usually varies between three and five. While the indicative and the imperative are universally recognized as separate moods, some include the conditional in the indicative (Bosque 2012, p. 374). In 1931, the Royal Spanish Academy recognized five moods, including the infinitive, but by 1973, the number shrank into three, with the conditional and the infinitive no longer being listed (Busch 2017, p. 9). According to Solodow (2010, pp. 246, 260), the status of the conditional – which began as the "future-in-the-past tense – as a separate mood is a later development of all the Romance languages (including Spanish), the descendants of Latin, where it is part of the indicative. Busch (2017, p. 47) writes that the conditional can be regarded as a halfway between the indicative and the subjunctive, being mostly used in a dependent clause, especially the one introduced by if.) moods that exist in the Spanish language. It usually appears in a dependent clause separated from the independent one by the complementizer que ("that"), but not all dependent clauses require it. When the subjunctive appears, the clause may describe necessity, possibility, hopes, concession, condition, indirect commands, uncertainty, or emotionality of the speaker. The subjunctive may also appear in an independent clause, such as ones beginning with ojalá ("hopefully"), or when it is used for the negative imperative. A verb in this mood is always distinguishable from its indicative counterpart by its different conjugation.

The Spanish subjunctive mood descended from Latin, but is morphologically far simpler, having lost many of Latin's forms. Some of the subjunctive forms do not exist in Latin, such as the future, whose usage in modern-day Spanish survives only in legal language and certain fixed expressions. However, other forms of the subjunctive remain widely used in all dialects and varieties. There are two types of subjunctive conjugation of regular verbs, one for verbs whose infinitive ends in -er or -ir and another for verbs whose infinitive ends in -ar.

== Overview ==
Spanish, also referred to as Castilian to differentiate it from other languages spoken in Spain, is an Indo-European language of the Italic branch. Belonging to the Romance family, it is a daughter language of Latin, evolving from its popular register that used to be spoken on the Iberian Peninsula. As Spain's influence grew through colonialism, the language spread outside Europe, particularly in the Americas. Contacts with other languages throughout its history have yielded many dialects and varieties with unique vocabulary and grammar. As of 2023, almost 600 million people speak Spanish, making it the fourth-most spoken language, after English, Mandarin Chinese, and Hindi, and the most spoken Romance language in the world.

Spanish grammar is typical to that of most Indo-European languages, with verbs undergoing complex patterns of conjugation. Compared to Latin, Spanish has a far simpler nominal morphology, with no distinction of case in any parts of speech except pronouns. The three genders of Latin were simplified into two (masculine and feminine), with neuter disappearing in all but demonstratives, pronouns, and articles; unlike the other two, the neuter refers to abstract ideas or concepts, when there is no noun being referred to, and is modified by the masculine singular of an adjective, such as lo bueno ("the good [thing/aspect]").

The complexity of Spanish grammar is found primarily in verbs. Inflected forms of a Spanish verb contain a lexical root, a theme vowel, and inflection; for example, the verb cantar ("to sing") becomes cantamos (Note: The word contains the lexical root cant-, the theme vowel -a- and the inflection -mos.) ("we sing") in its first-person plural, present indicative form. Verbs inflect for tense, number, person, mood, aspect, voice, and gender. Spanish also features the T–V distinction, the pronoun that the speaker uses to address the interlocutor – formally or informally (Note: This distinction is not always the same across dialects. Tú and vos are both informal second-person singular pronouns, each has its own conjugation; the latter is predominantly found in the Rioplatense dialect, while the former is in the rest of the Spanish-speaking world (Butt & Benjamin 1994, pp. 125–126). In the standard Spanish, the formal equivalent is usted, a contraction of vuestra merced ("your mercy"), which takes the third-person agreement, as does its plural counterpart, ustedes (Kattán-Ibarra & Pountain 2003, p. 35). These three pronouns can even also be used within the same dialect, resulting in a tripartite system of address; a 2020 study shows that it is prevalent in a number of dialects of Colombian Spanish, with tú and vos are both used informally, even though the national standard is to use tú (informal) and usted (formal) only; it is also not uncommon to hear usted in the informal conversations of the Colombians (Michnowicz & Quintana Sarria 2020, pp. 122–123; Roby 2009, p. 88). Conversely, in the plural, most dialects (notably in Latin America) do not feature the formal–informal distinction, with solely ustedes in use; in Castilian Spanish, vosotros and ustedes are used informally and formally, respectively, with the former having different conjugation, while in Latin America, vosotros is archaic (Kattán-Ibarra & Pountain 2003, pp. 35, 59–71).) – leading to the increasing number of verb forms. Most verbs have regular conjugation, which can be known from their infinitive form, which may end in -ar, -er, or -ir. However, some are irregular, despite their infinitive having one of these endings, and knowing how to conjugate them is a matter of memorization.

== Terminology ==
Constituting one of the grammatical categories of Spanish, mood indicates modality, that is, the way a hypothetical or desired situation is expressed in a language. There are three to five moods in Spanish, among which is the subjunctive, which occurs in dependent clauses and, sometimes, in independent clauses to describe at least one of the following expressions: necessity, possibility, hopes, concession, condition, indirect commands, uncertainty, and emotionality. It also occurs after several conjunctions, even though they may not have one of these nuances. Some verbs trigger only the subjunctive; for the others, a change of meaning may happen when one substitutes the subjunctive verb of a dependent clause with an infinitive one.

"With the subjunctive we are not making a declarative statement about something that exists or happens independently – but about the dependent object, subject or attribute of a higher predicate that characterizes it as its result and something non- or counterfactual: a wish, the object of an emotion, a doubt or an alternative."

— Busch (2017, p. 146)

There has been disagreement among linguists as to how the subjunctive mood should be defined. In the view of Spanish linguist Emilio Alarcos Llorach, it indicates the fictitious or unreal nature of the verbal root from which a form conjugated in this mood derives. He adds that the subjunctive is the marked form of the indicative. Another linguist, María Ángeles Sastre Ruano, similarly calls the subjunctive "the mode of virtuality, of hypothesis, of subjective assessment of reality", (Note: Spanish: "... modo de la virtualidad, de lo hipótetico, de la valoración subjetiva de la realidad.") contrasting it with the indicative that is "of factuality and of objective imposition of phenomena". (Note: Spanish: "... modo de la factualidad y de la imposición objetiva de los fenómenos.")

In his monograph on the subjunctive, University of Delaware professor Hans-Jörg Busch argues that the mood lacks meaning at all, and that focus be given more on recognizing when it appears than questioning its semantic values. Miguel Duro Moreno of the University of Málaga states that the subjunctive is to be used when the action is no more than the product of the speaker's mental attitude towards it. A specialist of Romance linguistics, John N. Green, notes that opinions are polarized between linguists who argue for its recognition as a separate category and those who see it merely as a marker of subordination. He concludes that it is difficult to arrive on a uniform meaning of the subjunctive, and that defining it simply as a mood of uncertainty is unable to cover all of its functions.

The Spanish translation of "subjunctive" is subjuntivo, deriving from the Latin modus subiunctīvus ("subjoined mood"), a loan translation of the Greek ῠ̔ποτᾰκτῐκή ἔγκλισις (hupotaktikḗ énklisis, "subordinated mood"). Linguists of Spanish have also referred to the subjunctive mood by other names, such as "the mood of non-reality" ("el modo de la no-realidad"), "the mood of uncertainty" ("el modo de la incertidumbre"), "the mood of subjectivity" ("el modo de la subjetividad"), and "the mood of indefinite futurity" ("el modo de la futuridad indefinida").

== Usage ==
The subjunctive is almost always found in a subordinate clause, whereas in the main clause, the indicative is used. In a sentence in which two clauses are present, the complementizer que ("that") is inserted to separate them. Sometimes the word is omitted if the subjunctive is in the second clause, although this practice is limited to official language, such as in business letters. The verb of the second clause is either in the indicative or the subjunctive, depending on the one in the main clause; if the latter is of saying, thinking, or believing, the indicative is usually preferred, while if it is of an emotional state, such as volition, exhortation, demand, or fear, the subjunctive is. (Note: Butt & Benjamin (1994, pp. 248–249) provides a list of verbs of emotion.) However, this is not true in all cases; verbs of belief trigger the subjunctive when they are negated or when the meaning is to be hypothetical or hesitant. Linguist Christopher Pountain demonstrates how a verb of emotion can be followed by either the indicative or the subjunctive, but with a different change in meaning, sometimes subtle or invisible when translated to English:

"Temía que lo supieran." ("I was afraid that they would get to know.")
The degree of fear is a genuine one.
"Temía que no vendríais." ("I was afraid that you (plural) would not come.")
The degree of fear is a "conventional, polite" one.

As it has been stated, the negation of a verb of belief in the main clause triggers the subjunctive in the next clause, but it is also not wrong to use the indicative. The sentence "Michael no cree que Panamá sea un país hispanohablante" ("Michael does not believe that Panama is a Spanish-speaking country") only presents Michael's opinion of Panama and the speaker is being neutral of it, while "Michael no cree que Panamá es un país hispanohablante" (same meaning as above) presents an intervention of the speaker's opinion, that is, the speaker believes that Panama is a Spanish-speaking country, which is contrary to what Michael believes. Verbs of thinking can also use the subjunctive, giving an invitation of doing something.

There are also occasions of the subjunctive in a single-clause sentence; this may happen when it is used as the formal positive imperative or the negative one, as well as after certain words, including ojalá ("hopefully") and adverbs of possibility, including probablemente ("probably"). However, Busch disagrees, calling such usage "pseudo-independent", and argues that different constructions are also possible, wherein two clauses occur, the first with the indicative and the other with the subjunctive; the dependency of the subjunctive to this kind of words, he adds, makes it in fact not possible to appear independently. Consider the following example:

- "Independent" subjunctive construction:

"¡Ojalá (que) venga a verme mañana!" ("I hope he/she/you (singular-formal) come(s) to see me tomorrow!")

- Alternative construction:

"Quiero que venga a verme mañana." ("I want that he/she/you (singular-formal) come to see me tomorrow.")

Switching the position of the clauses cannot be done without a complementizer and optionally a subject pronoun. Thus, the following construction is possible even though it would usually sound awkward in English:

"(El) que venga a verme mañana quiero." ("That he come to see me tomorrow, I want.")

Verbs of causation trigger the subjunctive mood; Busch explains that the event or action in the subordinate clause does not exist independently from what is said in the main clause, and the focus is given to what causes it or who originates it, appearing in the main clause, not what the result is, appearing in the dependent clause; the outcome is irrelevant. Thus, a correct sentence would be:

"La lluvia hizo que los ríos se desbordaran." ("The rain caused the rivers to overflow.")

The subjunctive mood is also found in relative clauses, which describe the noun that they modify, and once more the use of the indicative changes the meaning. If the subjunctive is used, it suggests that the antecedent may not exist or is not known to be in existence, and that the speaker desires that it exist; the use of the indicative suggests a definite existence and only describes the noun modified. Below is the example:

"María quiere casarse con un hombre que tiene mucho dinero." ("María wants to marry a man that has a lot of money.")
The use of the indicative gives the information that María knows the one to whom she wants to marry, and she is only describing what the man is like.
"María quiere casarse con un hombre que tenga mucho dinero." ("María wants to marry a man that should have a lot of money.")
The use of the subjunctive indicates the condition that the man to whom she wants to marry should meet; María does not have a specific man in mind, meaning that he is only hypothetical, and she wants the man to be like this, if she meets one.

However, nonexistent antecedents require only the subjunctive, including the pronouns nada ("nothing") or nadie ("no one"), nouns preceded by ningún ("no"), and when the main clause is negated. The construction "Whether ... or" is formed by the subjunctive; the same verb of this mood occurs twice in a sentence: "tengas razón o no la tengas." ("whether you are right or wrong.") Words ending in -quiera ("-ever"), such as cualquiera ("whatever/whichever") and quienquiera ("whoever"), require the subjunctive; dondequiera ("wherever") requires it only if an unspecified time or future is referred to, while past or habitual occurrences use the indicative.

The subjunctive is not needed when the subject of the dependent clause is the same as that of the main clause; the infinitive replaces the subjunctive clause altogether. Verbs of prohibition, request, or advice also allow the two verb forms to be used interchangeably; "Te dejo que me invites" and "Te dejo invitarme" (both meaning "I will let you pay for me") are possible. The usage of the subjunctive mood also varies regionally, but grammarians John Butt and Carmen Benjamin note that there is not much difference in educated speech. Furthermore, verbs that nowadays trigger the subjunctive mood may have triggered the indicative in the past, as has happened to verbs of emotion. Busch notes that the use of the indicative for this kind of verb is also retained by many speakers from Latin America, despite not being the standard.

=== Tenses ===
A simple tense uses one word to inform of its semantic values; on the other hand, a compound tense involves a construction of two or more words, which in Spanish is done by using the auxiliary verb haber followed by a past participle. There are three subjunctive simple tenses: present, imperfect, and future, but only the former two are still in active use. At least three subjunctive compound tenses exist: present perfect, past perfect, and future perfect, with the first two in active use. Butt and Benjamin list five additional compound tenses that they note are also "common"; they are:

- Present continuous (present subjunctive of estar + gerund)
- Imperfect continuous (imperfect subjunctive of estar + gerund)
- Future continuous (future subjunctive of estar + gerund)
- Present perfect continuous (present subjunctive of haber + past participle of estar + gerund)
- Past perfect continuous (imperfect subjunctive of haber + past participle of estar + gerund)

==== Present ====
For regular -ar verbs, the simple present subjunctive is formed by removing the inflectional -o of the first-person present indicative and adding one of these endings:

	Singular	Plural
First person	-e	-emos
Second person	-es	-éis
Third person	-e	-en

-e (first and third person singular), -es (second person singular), -emos (first person plural), -éis (second person plural), and -en (third person plural). For regular -er and -ir verbs, these endings are used instead: -a (first and third person singular), -as (second person singular), -amos (first person plural), -áis (second person plural), and -an (third person plural). Most irregular verbs also follow these patterns; six verbs – dar ("to give"), estar ("to be"), haber ("to have", auxiliary), ir ("to go"), saber ("to know"), and ser ("to be") – are highly irregular.

A subordinate clause that concerns an event that may take place in the future, beginning with words such as cuando ("when"), uses the present subjunctive. The present perfect subjunctive, formed by the present subjunctive of haber followed by a past participle, refers to an event that was previously a possibility but has already taken place at the time of speaking. Thus, the event still has some relevance to the present time, as seen in the following sentence: "Espero que no hayan salido del aeropuerto" ("I hope that they have not left the airport").

Tense agreement affects what subjunctive tense should be used, but there are no fixed rules for this matter. Butt and Benjamin provide a number of common combinations of tenses: if the main clause is in the present tense, one has to use the present subjunctive for the dependent clause, but the present perfect subjunctive if the comment made is about a past event – the imperfect subjunctive may be used as well, replacing the latter; if the main clause is in the future tense, one can use either the present subjunctive or the present perfect subjunctive for the dependent clause; if the main clause is in the present perfect tense, the dependent clause should be in the present or present perfect. A sentence, consisting of an imperative clause, should have the other clause in the present subjunctive.

The singular and plural third-person present subjunctive forms are used to form the imperative mood for usted and ustedes, respectively. The negative imperatives are all formed from this subjunctive as well. A self-standing present subjunctive verb in the first-person plural has the meaning of let's in English; thus, "¡Entremos!" translates to "Let's go in!". Vamos is originally another form of vayamos, the present subjunctive of ir ("to go"), before in the sixteenth century vayamos came to be the standard and vamos remains in the positive imperative usage; vayamos is used in the negative imperative or some set phrases ("Vayamos al grano", meaning "Let's go to the point"). However, this imperative is rare and speakers tend to use the construction vamos a ("let's go to") followed by an infinitive or simply a ("to") and an infinitive.

==== Imperfect ====
There are two sets of endings of the imperfect (or simple past) subjunctive, one that contains -ra and the other -se.

-ar subjunctive imperfect endings
	Singular	Plural
First person	-ara/-ase	-áramos/-ásemos
Second person	-aras/-ases	-arais/-aseis
Third person	-ara/-ase	-aran/-asen

-er/ir subjunctive imperfect endings
	Singular	Plural
First person	-iera/-iese	-iéramos/-iésemos
Second person	-ieras/-ieses	-ierais/-ieseis
Third person	-iera/-iese	-ieran/-iesen

For regular -ar verbs, it is formed by taking a verb's third-person preterit stem and then adding one of these endings: -ara/-ase (first and third person singular), -aras/-ases (second person singular), -áramos/-ásemos (first person plural), -arais/-aseis (second person plural), and -aran/-asen (third person plural). For regular -er and -ir verbs, these endings are used instead: -iera/-iese (first and third person singular), -ieras/-ieses (second person singular), -iéramos/-iésemos (first person plural), -ierais/-ieseis (second person plural), and -ieran/-iesen (third person plural).

The two subjunctives have their origins in Latin; from the past perfect indicative came the -ra form, and from the past perfect subjunctive came the -se form. Both subjunctives are found in Spain, but the -se one is almost extinct or much rarer in Latin America, where it is seen as a characteristic of the Spanish of Spain; Latin American writers imitating a European style would likely use the form. Debates on whether their subjunctive values are the same continue; some grammarians argue that the -se form implies a remoter likelihood and "an impression of insistence", while the -ra form "brings everything into relatively sharper focus" and puts more emphasis to the speech. In literary and journalistic writings, the -ra subjunctive may also replace the past perfect indicative, even though only in subordinate clauses, mainly the relative; for example, "el libro que leyera" ("the book (that) he had read"); "Leyera el libro" ("He had read the book") is ungrammatical.

The imperfect subjunctive is used in a counterfactual conditional clause, which begins with si ("if"), and the other clause is usually in the conditional mood: "If I were rich, I would buy a house." (Spanish: "Si yo fuera/fuese rico, compraría una casa.") The perfect past subjunctive (the imperfect subjunctive of haber and then a past participle) refers to an unfulfilled condition in the past, and the other clause would be in the perfect conditional: "Si yo hubiera/hubiese tenido dinero, habría comprado la casa" ("If I had been rich, I would have bought the house"). Regarding tense agreement, if the main clause uses the imperfect, preterite, or past perfect indicative, either the imperfect or past perfect subjunctive is used. However, if the event of the subordinate clause is timelessly true, the present subjunctive is optional: "Dios decretó que las serpientes no tengan patas" ("God decreed that snakes should have no legs").

==== Future ====
"... sólo la aplicación de un plan de estrictas medidas, aun cuando éstas resultaren antipopulares, permitirá salir de la actual situación." (Note: English: "... only the application of a plan of strict matters, even if these were unpopular, would permit us to get out of the present situation.")

— An example of the future subjunctive (bold) in an undated article of La Nación, quoted by Butt & Benjamin (1994, p. 272)

The simple future subjunctive is formed by replacing the a of any -ra imperfect subjunctive form with an e. Since it has no equivalent in Latin, it might have emerged from the merging of the future perfect indicative and the present perfect subjunctive. The development of the future subjunctive also happened in two other Iberian Romance languages: Portuguese and Galician, but the former stands out as the only one whose speakers still use it in daily speech. Japanese philologist Noritaka Fukushima writes that the earliest attestation of the Spanish future subjunctive was from the tenth century. Despite noting its obsolescence, many modern grammars still mention it, which is attributable to its widespread use in writings from the Golden Age and its infrequent modern occurrence.

Subordinate clauses could not feature the future subjunctive; the tense's usage were found in adverbial clauses denoting posteriority, such as those beginning with cuando ("when") and después que ("after"), but even in the early stage of Spanish, the present subjunctive may have also been used in these clauses, replacing the future subjunctive, attested as early as the thirteenth century. The conjunction si ("if") used to be followed by the future subjunctive, before such a construction started being replaced by the one with the present indicative in the sixteenth century. Spoken language had the future subjunctive eliminated around the same time, during which the usage was highly associated with the registers of upper socioeconomic classes. Until the eighteenth century, the future subjunctive was found in relative clauses among educated speakers, before its present counterpart become more common. The perfect form, constructed by the future subjunctive of haber with a past participle, denotes an action as if it had been performed before another future event; more common nowadays is to use either future perfect indicative or present perfect subjunctive.

In modern Spanish, the future subjunctive remains only in set phrases, such as sea lo que fuere ("whatever it may be"; more normally sea lo que sea) and venga lo que viniere ("come what may"; more normally venga lo que venga), and ecclesiastical and official, notably legal, documents. Its use may also indicate a stylistic choice, mainly found in newspapers, or a very remote possibility in literary language. Latin America sees more usage or a slower decline of this subjunctive than Spain does. In 1921, writer Pedro Henríquez Ureña reported it being employed in the Dominican varieties "without effort by the cultured". A 1968 observation by dialectologist Germán de Granda mentions more countries retaining the usage, including Puerto Rico, Cuba, Panama, and Venezuela.

== Bibliography ==
- Alarcos Llorach, Emilio (1994). Gramática de la lengua española [Grammar of the Spanish Language] (in Spanish). Espasa-Calpe. ISBN 84-239-7840-0.
- Bosque, Ignacio (2012). "Moods: Indicative vs. Subjunctive". In Hualde, José Ignacio; Olarrea, Antxon; O'Rourke, Erin (eds.). The Handbook of Hispanic Linguistics. Wiley. ISBN 978-1-4051-9882-0.
- Bradley, Peter T.; Mackenzie, Ian (2004). Spanish: An Essential Grammar. Routledge. ISBN 0-415-28642-5.
- Busch, Hans-Jörg (2017). The Spanish Subjunctive: A Reference for Teachers. Taylor & Francis. ISBN 978-1-138-96314-6.
- Butt, John; Benjamin, Carmen (1994). A New Reference Grammar of Modern Spanish. Edward Arnold. ISBN 978-1-4615-8368-4.
- Celorio Puente, Marta (1960). A Complete Treatise on the Conjugation of Spanish Verbs. D. McKay Company.
- Dawson, Laila M.; Dawson, Albert C. (1993). Dicho y Hecho: Beginning Spanish. Wiley. ISBN 0-471-57385-X.
- Duro Moreno, Miguel (22–26 February 1994). Estilo y modos del verbo: Pequeño catálogo de recomendaciones para el mejor uso del indicativo y subjuntivo en la traducción profesional de informática del inglés al español [Style and moods of verb: Small catalog of recommendations for the better usage of the indicative and the subjunctive in the professional translation of informatics from English to Spanish] (PDF). V Encuentros complutenses en torno a la traducción (in Spanish). pp. 565–574.
- Fratini, Viviana; Acha, Joana; Laka, Itziar (June 14, 2014). "Frequency and morphological irregularity are independent variables. Evidence from a corpus study of Spanish verbs". Corpus Linguistics and Linguistic Theory. 10 (2): 289–314. doi:10.1515/cllt-2013-0028. S2CID 56045604.
- Fukushima, Noritaka (October 3, 2015). Pasado, presente y futuro del subjuntivo en español [Past, present and future of the subjunctive in Spanish] (PDF). Segundo Congreso del Español y la Cultura Hispánica en Japón (in Spanish). Tokyo. pp. 45–61.
- Green, John N. (1988). "Spanish". In Harris, Martin; Vincent, Nigel (eds.). The Romance Languages. Routledge. doi:10.4324/9780203426531. ISBN 978-1-134-71229-8.
- Jensen, Frede; Lathrop, Thomas A. (1973). The Syntax of Old Spanish Subjunctive. Mouton & Co. N.V.
- Juge, Matthew L. (2023). "Increasing morphological mismatch via category loss: The Spanish Future Subjunctive". In Kavistkaya, Darya; Yu, Alan C. L. (eds.). The Life Cycle of Language: Past, Present, and Future. Oxford University Press. ISBN 9780192845818.
- Kany, Charles E. (1967). American-Spanish Syntax. University of Chicago Press.
- Kattán-Ibarra, Juan; Pountain, Christopher J. (2003). Modern Spanish Grammar: A Practical Guide. Routledge. ISBN 0-203-44036-6.
- Kania, Sonia (29 September 2021). "The Use of the Future Subjunctive in Colonial Spanish Texts: Evidence of Vitality or Demise?". Languages. 6 (4): 157–171. doi:10.3390/languages6040157.
- Kempchinsky, Paula (2016). "Subjuntivo" [Subjunctive]. In Gutiérrez-Rexach, Javier (ed.). Enciclopedia de Lingüística Hispánica [Encyclopedia of Hispanic Linguistics] (in Spanish). Vol. 2. Routledge. ISBN 978-1-138-94138-0.
- López-Barrios, Wílmar (October 2022). "Decline and substitution of Spanish future subjunctive in northwest and southwest Colombia from the sixteenth to the nineteenth centuries". Journal of Linguistic Geography. 10 (2): 130–148. doi:10.1017/jlg.2022.7. S2CID 251605086.
- McKinnon, Sean (2018). "An initial examination of imperfect subjunctive variation in Catalonian Spanish". In MacDonald, Jonathan E. (ed.). Contemporary Trends in Hispanic and Lusophone Linguistics. John Benjamins Publishing Company. ISBN 978-90-272-6461-9.
- Michnowicz, Jim; Quintana Sarria, Vannessa (2020). "A New Look at Forms of Address in the Spanish of Cali, Colombia". Bulletin of Hispanic Studies. 4 (2): 121–139.
- Penny, Ralph John (2002). A History of the Spanish Language. Cambridge University Press. ISBN 0-521-80587-2.
- Pinkerton, Edward C. (1982). Word for Word. VERBATIM Books. ISBN 0-930454-06-5.
- Portner, Paul (2009). Modality. Oxford University Press. ISBN 978-0-19-929243-1.
- Pountain, Christopher (2016). Exploring the Spanish Language: An Introduction to Its Structures and Varieties. Taylor & Francis. ISBN 978-1-315-73507-8.
- Roby, David Brian (2009). Aspect and the Categorization of States: The Case of Ser and Estar in Spanish. John Benjamins Publishing Company. ISBN 978-90-272-8894-3.
- Solodow, Joseph B. (2010). Latin Alive: The Survival of Latin in English and the Romance Languages. Cambridge University Press. ISBN 978-0-521-51575-7.
- Stockwell, Robert P.; Bowen, J. Donald; Martin, John W. (1965). The Grammatical Structures of English and Spanish. University of Chicago Press. ISBN 0-226-77504-6.
- Vogt, Eric W. (2017). Practice Makes Perfect: Spanish Past-Tense Verbs Up Close. McGraw Hill Education. ISBN 978-1-26-001073-2.
- Zagona, Karen (2002). The Syntax of Spanish. Cambridge University Press. ISBN 0-521-57177-4.
