= Catalan syntax =

Catalan language syntax

In the Catalan-Valencian, sentences consist of a collection of noun phrases grouped around a verb. One of these noun phrases has the syntactic function of subject while the others function as complements (direct, indirect, prepositional or verbal), or adverbials (of time, place, manner, etc.). The sentence can be introduced by a 'frame' (for example 'as far as X is concerned', or an adverbial of time or place).

The main features of the sentence are the agreement in person and number between the subject and the verb - which marks the relation between the speaker, on the one hand, and his or her interlocutors and any other people, on the other - and time, which situates the action in relation to the present of the speaker or in relation to the time of the other sentences of the text or discourse. In attributive sentences (see below), as well as agreement in person and number between the subject and the verb, there is also agreement of gender and number between the subject and the head of the attribute when it is a noun or an adjective.

In Catalan there are four main types of sentence:

1. Predicative sentences, consisting of a subject, a verb and some complements. En Jordi va collir tres roses per a la Núria (Jordi picked three roses for Núria). La colla camina per la carretera amb pas decidit (The group walked purposefully along the road).
2. Attributive sentences, which express a characteristic of the subject, the attribute, which is linked to it by a copulative or quasi-copulative verb. La plaça era plena a vessar (The square was full to bursting). La camisa estava bruta (The shirt was dirty). El cel semblava de plom (The sky looked leaden).
3. Impersonal sentences, which do not have a subject. Plou. Neva. Fa sol. Està núvol. (It's raining. It's snowing. It's sunny. It's cloudy.)
4. Unaccusative sentences, which have the verb in initial position followed by a noun phrase which has the dual function of subject and direct object, and which is the new information provided by the sentence. Avui s'han publicat tres notícies sobre terratrèmols Today three news items have been published on earthquakes). Hi ha mosques al celler (There are flies in the cellar). Per aquí hi passen molts cotxes (A lot of cars come past here). Li convenen unes bones vacances (He needs a good holiday).

The neutral order of sentences is shown by the examples for each of the above types: subject, verb (and complements) for type 1; subject, verb and attribute for type 2; no subject for type 3 and verb followed by a noun phrase for type 4. In general, however, Catalan is an SVO language.

Sentences can be simple or compound, depending on whether they contain just one verb or more than one. In the sentences with more than one verb, they can be on an equal footing (juxtaposition or coordination), or there may be one main verb and other subordinate ones. Within the main clause, subordinate clauses can be the subject and object (direct or prepositional), which in simple sentences are usually expressed by noun phrases. Subordinate clauses can also contain other subordinate clauses.

One feature of Catalan syntax is the role played by the so-called weak pronouns, which can change the order of the sentence by removing one of the elements for pragmatic reasons, but keeping the sentence structured around the verb. This sort of construction, known as topicalization, is used in dialogues, to take up what has been said by the interlocutors, and monologues, and it can make a text coherent thanks to the technique of thema and rheme or thematic progression. For example, one response to the question On has posat les roses? (Where have you put the roses?") could be Les he posades al gerro de l'entrada (I've put them in the vase in the hallway), in which the theme of the question is picked up in the pronoun les, or Les roses les he posades al gerro de l'entrada (The roses, I've put in the vase in the hallway), in which "les roses" is in theme position and the sentence is still structured around the verb with the pronoun les. More than one complement can be put in theme position: No les hi posis, les roses, al gerro de l'entrada, que està esquerdat! (Don't put the roses in the vase in the hall because it's cracked!), in which les represents les roses and hi, "the vase in the hall".
