= Linguistics Vanguard =

- Discipline: General linguistics
- Language: English
- Edited by: Alexander Bergs, Abigail C. Cohn, Jeff Good

Publication details
- History: 2015–present
- Publisher: De Gruyter
- Frequency: Annual
- Open access: Hybrid
- Impact factor: 1.1 (2023)

Standard abbreviations
- ISO 4: Linguist. Vanguard

Indexing
- ISSN: 2199-174X

Links
- Journal homepage

Linguistics Vanguard is an annual peer-reviewed academic journal of general linguistics that was established in 2015 and is published by De Gruyter. Its editors-in-chief are Alexander Bergs, Abigail C. Cohn, and Jeff Good.

According to the Journal Citation Reports, the journal has a 2023 impact factor of 1.1.

== See also ==
- List of linguistics journals
