= Alexander Bergs =

German linguist

- Born: March 30, 1974; Mönchengladbach
- Education: Heinrich Heine University (PhD), Edinburgh University
- Scientific career
- Institutions: University of Osnabrück
- Thesis: Social Networks and Historical Sociolinguistics: Studies in Morphosyntactic Variation in the Paston Letters (1421-1503) (2002)
- Website: www.alexanderbergs.de

Alexander Thomas Bergs (born March 30, 1974) is a German linguist and professor of English linguistics at the University of Osnabrück.

== Career ==
Alexander Bergs studied English, German, chemistry, education and philosophy at Heinrich Heine University in Düsseldorf and general linguistics, English language and Scots at Edinburgh University. This was followed by his doctorate in 2002 on the subject of “Social Networks and Historical Sociolinguistics: Studies in Morphosyntactic Variation in the Paston Letters (1421–1503) ”, and four years later his habilitation in English linguistics with the title "The Expression of Futurity in Contemporary English: Form, Function, Development".

Bergs has been Professor of Linguistics at the University of Osnabrück since 2006. He was there from 2008 to 2010 and has been Dean of the Department of Linguistics and Literature since 2016. His research focuses include Language variation and change, construction grammar approaches to language analysis, language in context, the syntax-pragmatics interface and cognitive poetics. He also completed numerous teaching stays at the universities of Bonn, Santiago de Compostela, Wisconsin-Milwaukee, Catania, Vigo, Thessaloniki, Athens and Dalian.

He is the editor-in-chief and co-founder of Linguistics Vanguard, along with Abby Cohn (Cornell) and Jeff Good (Buffalo).

== Works ==
- Social Networks and Historical Sociolinguistics: Studies in Morphosyntactic Variation in the Paston Letters (1421–1503). Mouton de Gruyter, Berlin/New York 2005. ISBN 978-3110183108
- Modern Scots. Zweite überarbeitete Auflage, Lincom Europa, München/Newcastle 2005, ISBN 978-3895863172
- ed. with Gabriele Diewals: Constructions and Language Change. In: Trends in Linguistics. Studies and Monographs (TiLSM 194). Mouton de Gruyter, Berlin/New York 2008. ISBN 978-3110198669
- ed. with Gabriele Diewals: Contexts and Constructions. In: Constructional Approaches to Language (CAL 9). John Benjamins Publishing Company, Amsterdam/Philadelphia 2009 ISBN 978-9027204318
- An Introduction to Synchronic English Linguistics. Peter Lang, Frankfurt/M., New York 2012. ISBN 978-3631561751
- ed. with Laurel J. Brinton: English Historical Linguistics: An International Handbook, Mouton de Gruyter, Berlin/Boston 2012, ISBN 978-3-11-020220-5
- Handbücher Sprache und Kommunikation (HSK). 34.1 und 34.2 (2 Vols). Mouton de Gruyter, Berlin/Boston 2012. ISBN 978-3110202205, ISBN 978-3110202656
- with Kate Burridge: Understanding Historical Linguistics. Routledge, London 2016. ISBN 978-0415713382
