= Colin Phillips =

British linguist

- Citizenship: United Kingdom, United States
- Education: Oxford University; University of Rochester; Massachusetts Institute of Technology
- Partner: Andrea Zukowski
- Children: 1
- Scientific career
- Institutions: University of Delaware; University of Maryland, College Park; Oxford University

Colin Phillips is a British-American psycholinguist who is Professor of Linguistics at the University of Oxford and Professorial Fellow at Somerville College, Oxford. He maintains a part-time professorship at the University of Maryland, where he was previously director of the Maryland Language Science Center. He is an elected fellow of the Linguistic Society of America and the American Association for the Advancement of Science. He is also a co-editor of the Annual Review of Linguistics.

== Early life and education ==
Colin Phillips grew up in a rural town in eastern England. He attended University of Oxford, where he studied Medieval German literature. He then came to the United States on an exchange scholarship to study at University of Rochester for a year, where he became more interested in linguistics. He then attended graduate school at Massachusetts Institute of Technology, where he planned to study semantics.

== Career ==
Philipps researches language acquisition and language processing. In 1997, he was hired at the University of Delaware as an assistant professor. In 2000, he accepted a position as an assistant professor at the University of Maryland, College Park. He was promoted to associate professor in 2002 and full professor in 2008. He became the founding director of the Maryland Language Science Center in 2013.

He has been co-editor of the Annual Review of Linguistics with Mark Y. Liberman since 2021.

== Awards and honors ==
The Linguistic Society of America elected him as a fellow in 2018. In 2020, he was elected as a fellow of the American Association for the Advancement of Science.

== Personal life ==
During his study-abroad year at University of Rochester, he met his future wife, Andrea Zukowski. They have one child. In 2016, he and Zukowski founded College Park parkrun, a series of free running events in their area.
