= Annual Review of Linguistics =

- Discipline: Linguistics
- Language: English
- Edited by: Colin Phillips

Publication details
- History: 2015–present
- Publisher: Annual Reviews (United States)
- Frequency: Annually
- Open access: Subscribe to Open
- Impact factor: 5.2 (2025)

Standard abbreviations
- ISO 4: Annu. Rev. Linguist.

Indexing
- ISSN: 2333-9683 (print); 2333-9691 (web)

Links
- Journal homepage

The Annual Review of Linguistics is an annual peer-reviewed review journal published by Annual Reviews (AR), a nonprofit organization whose stated mission is to synthesize knowledge "for the progress of science and the benefit of society." The journal was established in 2015 and covers developments in the field of linguistics. The founding co-editors were Barbara Partee and Mark Y. Liberman. Partee was succeeded in 2021 by Colin Phillips. Colin Phillips became sole editor as of 2026. As of 2023, Annual Review of Linguistics is being published as open access, under the Subscribe to Open model.

== Abstracting and indexing ==
The journal is abstracted and indexed in Scopus, Social Sciences Citation Index, Linguistic Bibliography, Arts and Humanities Citation Index, and Modern Language Association Database. As of 2026, Journal Citation Reports gives the journal a 2025 impact factor of 5.2, ranking it thirteenth of 312 journals in the category "Linguistics (SSCI)".

== See also ==
- List of linguistics journals
