= Sámi Dieđalaš Áigečála =

Northern Sámi-language academic journal

- Language: Sámi languages
- Edited by: Arnstein Johnskareng; Harald Gaski

Publication details
- History: 1994–present
- Publisher: Septentrio Academic Publishing (Norway)
- Frequency: Biannual
- Open access: Yes

Standard abbreviations
- ISO 4: Sámi Dieđalaš Áigečála

Indexing
- ISSN: 0805-4312 (print); 1894-0498 (web)

Links
- Journal homepage

Sámi Dieđalaš Áigečála is a peer-reviewed interdisciplinary open access journal founded by the University of Tromsø Arctic University Center for Sámi Studies in Tromsø and the Sámi University of Applied Sciences in Guovdageaidnu, Norway. In March 2023, Septentrio Academic Publishing took over as the journal's publisher. The journal publishes scientific articles, book reviews, sample lectures, and academic histories in Sámi languages.

Sámi Dieđalaš Áigečála (which translates from Northern Sámi into English as "Sámi Scientific Journal") was first published in 1994. Starting in 2004, Sámi Dieđalaš Áigečála was published once per year, and since 2010 mostly twice per year. In 2013, the electronic version of the journal became open access, providing the opportunity for anyone to read articles online. Since 2009, the journal has been classified as "Level 2" journal in the Norwegian Scientific Index, the highest rating in the NSI system.

Sámi Dieđalaš Áigečála was the first peer-reviewed scientific publication founded to publish in Sámi languages, primarily Northern Sámi, and it is the most common outlet for Sámi University and University of Tromsø scholars looking to publish in that language. It has also published articles in Lule and Southern Sámi. The Research Council of Norway noted in 2017 Sámi Dieđalaš Áigečála's importance in raising the prestige of Sámi languages, something Sámi activists and scholars have also noted. The Butenschøn Panel Report (2012) on Sámi research and higher education also pointed to the role of Sámi Dieđalaš Áigečála in strengthening Sámi as a language of science.
