= Nominative case =

Grammatical case

In grammar, the nominative case (abbreviated nom), subjective case, straight case, or upright case is one of the grammatical cases of a noun or other part of speech, which generally marks the subject of a verb, or (in Latin and formal variants of English) a predicative nominal or adjective, as opposed to its object, or other verb arguments. Generally, the noun "that is doing something" is in the nominative, and the nominative is often the form listed in dictionaries.

== Etymology ==
The English word nominative comes from Latin cāsus nominātīvus "case for naming", which was translated from Ancient Greek ὀνομαστικὴ πτῶσις, onomastikḗ ptôsis "inflection for naming", from onomázō "call by name", from ónoma "name". Dionysius Thrax in his The Art of Grammar refers to it as orthḗ or eutheîa "straight", in contrast to the oblique or "bent" cases.

== Characteristics ==
The reference form (more technically, the least marked) of certain parts of speech is normally in the nominative case, but that is often not a complete specification of the reference form, as the number and the gender may need to be specified. Thus, the reference or least marked form of an adjective might be the nominative masculine singular.

The parts of speech that are often declined and therefore may have a nominative case are nouns, adjectives, pronouns and (less frequently) numerals and participles. The nominative case often indicates the subject of a verb but sometimes does not indicate any particular relationship with the other parts of a sentence. In some languages, the nominative case is unmarked, and it may then be said to be marked by a null morpheme. Moreover, in most languages with a nominative case, the nominative form is the lemma; that is, it is the reference form used to cite a word, to list it as a dictionary entry etc.

Nominative cases are found in Albanian, Arabic, Estonian, Sanskrit, Slovak, Ukrainian, Hungarian, Lithuanian, Georgian, German, Latin, Greek, Icelandic, Old English, Old French, Polish, Serbian, Czech, Romanian, Russian and Pashto, among other languages. English still retains some nominative pronouns, which are contrasted with the accusative (comparable to the oblique or disjunctive in some other languages): I (having the accusative me), we (having the accusative us), he (having the accusative him), she (having the accusative her), they (having the accusative them) and who (having the accusative whom). A usage that is archaic in most current English dialects is the singular second-person pronoun thou (accusative thee). A special case is the word you: originally, ye was its nominative form and you the accusative, but over time, you has come to be used for the nominative as well.

The term "nominative case" is most properly used in the discussion of nominative–accusative languages, such as Latin, Greek and most modern Western European languages.

In active–stative languages, there is a case, sometimes called nominative, that is the most marked case and is used for the subject of a transitive verb or a voluntary subject of an intransitive verb but not for an involuntary subject of an intransitive verb. Since such languages are a relatively new field of study, there is no standard name for this case.

=== Subjective case ===
English is now often described as having a subjective case, instead of a nominative, to draw attention to the differences between the "standard" generic nominative and the way that it is used in English. The term objective case is then used for the oblique case, which covers the roles of accusative, dative and objects of a preposition. The genitive case is then usually called the possessive form, rather than a noun case per se. English is then said to have two cases: the subjective and the objective.

== Examples ==
=== Subject ===
The nominative case marks the subject of a verb. When the verb is active, the nominative is the person or thing doing the action (agent); when the verb is passive, the nominative is the person or thing receiving the action.

- The boy saw her.
- She was seen by the boy.

=== Predicate noun or adjective ===
In copular sentences, the nominative is used for both subject and predicate.

- Socrates was a wise man.
- Socrates was wise.
