= Corpus Linguistics and Linguistic Theory =

- Discipline: Linguistics
- Language: English

Publication details
- History: 2005–present
- Publisher: Mouton de Gruyter
- Frequency: Biannually
- Impact factor: 0.760 (2016)

Standard abbreviations
- ISO 4: Corpus Linguist. Linguist. Theory

Indexing
- ISSN: 1613-7035
- OCLC no.: 179698731

Links
- Journal homepage

Corpus Linguistics and Linguistic Theory is a peer-reviewed academic journal that publishes articles and book reviews on corpus linguistics, with a focus on corpus-linguistic findings and their relevance to linguistic theory. It is published by de Gruyter Mouton and the editor-in-chief is Stefanie Wulff (University of Florida).
