= Personal pronouns in Catalan =

Catalan grammar

This article discusses the forms and functions of the personal pronouns in Catalan and Valencian.

== Strong pronouns ==
The "strong" pronouns (Catalan: pronoms forts) in Catalan have the following forms:

Catalan stressed pronouns
		singular	plural
1st person		jo, mi	nosaltres
1st person	majestic	(nós) Highly formal and archaic.	
2nd person	informal	tu	vosaltres
2nd person	formal	vostè	vostès
2nd person	respectful	(vós) Archaic in most dialects.	
3rd person	masculine	ell	ells
3rd person	feminine	ella	elles
3rd person	reflexive	si	
3rd person	impersonal	hom, un	

These forms are used as subject pronouns (with the exception of si), and also as disjunctive pronouns, for example, after a preposition.

- Jo encara no en sé gaire. ("I still don't know much about it.")
- Ell, no crec que vingui. ("Him, I don't think he's coming.")
- Han preguntat per vosaltres. ("They asked about you.")

The first person singular pronoun has a special form mi after most prepositions.

- Queda't amb mi. ("Stay with me.")

However, the form jo is used with some prepositions, for example, in segons jo ("according to me"), and in coordinated structures with another noun or pronoun: contra tu i jo ("against you and me").

The third person reflexive pronoun si (both singular and plural) cannot be used as a subject. It most commonly appears after a preposition, often reinforced by mateix:

- Ho va comprar per a si mateix. ("He bought it for himself.")
- Ho va comprar per a si mateixa. ("She bought it for herself.")
- Ho van comprar per a si mateixos. ("They bought it for themselves (masculine).")
- Ho van comprar per a si mateixes. ("They bought it for themselves (feminine).")

The 2nd person polite pronouns are vostè (singular) and vostès (plural). They combine with 3rd person verbs.

- Vostè em faria un favor? ("Would you do me a favor?")

The older form vós (with 2nd person plural verb agreement) can be found in some varieties of Catalan, and in contexts like administrative texts.

The 1st person majestic plural is expressed with the pronoun Nós (in place of nosaltres).

There exists as well an impersonal subject pronoun hom (unmarked for either gender or number), always used with 3rd person singular verbs, nowadays archaic and only used in writing:

- Hom no es fa monja perquè sí ("One does not become a nun because of nothing.")

== Weak pronouns ==
The weak pronouns (Catalan: pronoms febles) are proforms that, as the name indicates, do not carry stress. All are monosyllabic clitics, and all must always appear immediately before or after a verb: they cannot be used on their own or attached to a different element of the sentence. The combination of the verb plus the weak pronoun or pronouns always has a single stressed vowel, that of the verb.

=== Forms ===
Weak pronouns in Catalan vary according to:

1. the person, number, and gender of the antecedent
2. its syntactic function (direct or indirect object or adverbial complement).

The form of a given pronoun is determined by its position with respect to the verb, and whether it is adjacent to a vowel or a consonant in the verb. There are four possible configurations:

- reinforced form (forma reforçada): used before a verb that begins with a consonant, separated from the verb by a space

Em veieu. ("You see me.")

- elided form (forma elidida): used before a verb that begins with a vowel (or h-), and separated from it by an apostrophe

Això m'agrada ("I like that."; lit. "That pleases me")

- full form (forma plena): used after a verb that ends in a consonant (or a diphthong ending in -u), connected to the verb with a hyphen

En Joan no vol seguir-me. ("John doesn't want to follow me.")

- reduced form (forma reduïda): used after a verb that ends in a vowel, separated from it by an apostrophe (except in the case of -us)

Dóna'm un llibre. ("Give me a book.")

Not all pronouns have four distinct forms. The following table shows the complete inventory.

number	person	syntactic function	before the verb		after the verb	
number	person	syntactic function	before a consonant	before a vowel	after a consonant	after a vowel
singular	1st	direct/indirect object or reflexive (m. or f.)	em	m'	-me	'm
singular	2nd	direct/indirect object or reflexive (m. or f.)	et	t'	-te	't
singular	3rd	direct object (m.)	el	l'	-lo	'l
singular	3rd	direct object (f.)	la	l', la (Note: The unelided form la is used before verbs beginning in unstressed i- or u- (or hi-, hu-).)	-la	
singular	3rd	neuter object	ho		-ho	
singular	3rd	indirect object (m. or f.)	li		-li	
plural	1st	direct/indirect object or reflexive (m. or f.)	ens		-nos	'ns
plural	2nd	direct/indirect object or reflexive (m. or f.)	us		-vos	-us
plural	3rd	direct object (m.)	els		-los	'ls
plural	3rd	direct object (f.)	les		-les	
plural	3rd	indirect object (m. or f.)	els		-los	'ls
reflexive (m. or f., sg. or pl.)			es	s'	-se	's
adverbial		ablative/genitive	en	n'	-ne	'n
adverbial		locative	hi		-hi	

=== Uses ===
The weak pronouns primarily express complements of the verb.

- Direct objects

Ahir el vaig veure. ("Yesterday I saw him.")
Ahir la vaig veure. ("Yesterday I saw her.")

- Indirect objects

Li donaràs el llibre? ("Will you give him/her the book?")

- Reflexive pronouns

Reflexive – La nena es renta. ("The girl is washing herself.")
Pronominal – Tots es van penedir d'això. ("Everyone was sorry about that.")

- The neuter proform ho replaces pronouns such as açò ("this"), això, allò ("that"), or tot ("everything"), or even an entire clause.

No ho sé. ("I don't know [the thing you just asked about].")
-T'agrada mirar la televisió? -No, ho trobo avorrit. ("Do you like to watch TV?" "No, I think it's boring.")
Cal netejar-ho tot. ("We have to clean it all up.")

- The proform hi replaces adverbial complements such as:

Locative expressions, some of which can be replaced by a or en (aquí, allà...): Hi soc. ("I am [there]."); Hi visc. ("I live [there]."); Sempre he tingut ganes d'anar-hi. ("I've always wanted to go [there]."); No t'hi acostis! ("Stay away from there!")
Prepositional phrases denoting manner or instrument, or starting with the prepositions a, amb, en (especially en allò), per, etc.: Hi estic d'acord. ("I agree [with that, with you, etc]."); Hi treballo. ("I work [on that, there, with you, etc]."); Pensa-hi bé però no t'hi capfiquis, és la millor resposta que hi trobo. ("Think [about it] carefully, but don’t obsess [over it]; it’s the best answer I can come up with [to it]."); No m'hi havia fixat, en aquest detall. ("I hadn’t noticed in that detail"); No hi hem comptat. ("We didn’t take it into account."); Els hi portem, aquells llibres a la biblioteca ("We take those books to the library."); Fixeu-vos-hi! ("Pay attention to it!"); No us hi gasteu el diners! ("Don’t waste your money [there, on it, etc]!"); No m'hi fiquis! ("Don’t get me involved in it!" or "Don’t put me there")
Adverbs and adjectives used with verbs other than ser, ésser, estar, semblar, esdevenir: -Que t'has llevat alegre? -Sí, m'hi he llevat. (-"Did you get up in a good mood?" -"Yes, I did.")
Intransitive verbs of perception: L'home no hi sent. ("The man can't hear.")

- The adverbial proform en replaces

Prepositional phrases starting with de (d'allò, d'aquí, d'allà...): Tothom en parla. ("Everyone is talking about it."); En vinc. ("I'm from there."); N'estic cansat, de caminar. ("I’m tired of walking."); No en saps prou. ("You don’t know enough about it."); Ningú no vol parlar-ne. ("Nobody wants to talk about it."); D'aquest tipus de pasta, en diem canelons. ("We call this type of pasta cannelloni."); En soc conscient. ("I am aware [of that]."); Us en sortiu? ("Are you all managing it?"); Ens en sorprendríem ("We would be surprised [by that]."). Vull descobrir-ne més, saber-ne més, veure'n més... ("I want to discover more [of it], know more [about it], see more [of it]..."); Què en penseu? Què n'espereu? ("What do you think [about it]? What do you expect [from it]?"); Gaudiu-ne! ("Enjoy it!"); Anem-nos-en! ("Let’s get out of here!")
Unmodified nouns or nouns preceded by numbers, quantifying adverbs or an indefinite article: Quantes cases teniu? — En tenim dues/moltes. ("How many houses do you have?" — "We have two/many [of them]."); Tens adreça de correu electrònic? — Sí, en tinc. ("Have you got an email address?" — "Yes, I do."); Ahir me'n vas donar tres i avui me n'has donat quatre. ("Yesterday you gave me three [of them], and today you gave me four [of them].")

Even when referring to a place, if the preposition de is used, the pronoun used is en and not hi:

- Ens anem allà → Ens hi anem ["We’re going there."]
- Ens anem d'aquí → Ens n'anem or Ens en anem ["We’re leaving here."]

It is sometimes stated that hi is never used to replace a complement beginning with de. This is not completely accurate, as hi can replace adverbial phrases such as de pressa, de sobte, etc.

=== Position ===
The weak pronouns are either proclitic (appearing immediately before the verb) or enclitic (immediately after).

Enclitic pronouns are used with infinitives, gerunds, and positive imperatives.

- Pots fer-nos mandonguilles? ("Can you make us meatballs?")
- Veient-ho des de fora, analitzant-ho objectivament ("Seeing it from an outsider's point of view, analyzing it objectively")
- Vés-hi i espera'm. ("Go there and wait for me.")

With all other forms of the verb, the weak pronouns are proclitic. This includes, in particular, conjugated (finite) verbs and negative imperatives:

- Ens faràs encara mandonguilles? ("Will you make us meatballs again?")
- No m'esperis. ("Don't wait for me.")

In complex verbal constructions consisting of a conjugated verb and an infinitive or gerund, the pronoun can appear either before the first verb or after the second verb.

- Els volien atacar. or Volien atacar-los. ("They wanted to attack them.")
- L'estem escoltant. or Estem escoltant-lo. ("We are listening to him.")

=== Dialectal variation ===
Use of weak pronouns varies significantly across the Catalan linguistic area.

Northern Catalan (particularly as spoken in Northern Catalonia) and the Balearic dialect do not generally use the reinforced forms (e.g. te veig instead of et veig).

In the imperative mood in Northern Catalan, the reduced form of the pronoun is replaced by a tonic form (thus, not strictly being a weak pronoun anymore). For example, mira'm! (en: look at me!) in Northern Catalan is rendered as mira-mé!.

== Combinations of weak pronouns ==
When two weak pronouns appear with the same verb, they must appear in a fixed order, as illustrated in the following table:

3rd pers. reflexive	2nd pers.	1st pers.	3rd pers.		adverbial	
3rd pers. reflexive	2nd pers.	1st pers.	indirect obj.	direct obj.	adverbial	
es	et us	em ens	li els	el la els les ho	en	hi

The two pronouns must be selected from different columns, and furthermore ho cannot combine with en or hi.

All of the combinations allowed in the standard language are given in the following table, which also shows the necessary morpho-phonological and orthographic adjustments. In each cell of the table, the forms are listed in the following order, with the same contextual conditions as explained above for the simple pronouns:

Weak pronoun cluster forms
before a word that starts with a consonant
before a word that starts with a vowel (if any)
after a non-finite verb that ends in a consonant or -u
after a non-finite verb that ends in a vowel other than -u (if any)

First prounoun	Second pronoun											
First prounoun	hi	en	ho	les	la^{1}	els	el	li	ens	em	us	et
es	s'hi	se'n se n'	s'ho	se les	se la se l' or se la	se'ls	se'l se l'	se li	se'ns	se'm se m'	se us	se't se t'
es	-s'hi	-se'n	-s'ho	-se-les	-se-la	-se'ls	-se'l	-se-li	-se'ns	-se'm	-se-us	-se't
et	t'hi	te'n te n'	t'ho	te les	te la te l' or te la	te'ls	te'l te l'	te li	te'ns	te'm te m'		
et	-t'hi	-te'n	-t'ho	-te-les	-te-la	-te'ls	-te'l	-te-li	-te'ns	-te'm		
us	us hi	us n us n'	us ho	us les	us la us l' or us la	us els	us el us l'	us li	us ens	us em us m'		
us	-vos-hi -us-hi	-vos-en -us-en	-vos-ho -us-ho	-vos-les -us-les	-vos-la -us-la	-vos-els -us-els	-vos-el -us-el	-vos-li -us-li	-vos-ens -us-ens	-vos-em -us-em		
em	m'hi	me'n me n'	m'ho	me les	me la me l' or me la	me'ls	me'l me l'	me li				
em	-m'hi	-me'n	-m'ho	-me-les	-me-la	-me'ls	-me'l	-me-li				
ens	ens hi	ens en ens n'	ens ho	ens les	ens la ens l' or ens la	ens els	ens el ens l'	ens li				
ens	-nos-hi 'ns-hi	-nos-en 'ns-en	-nos-ho 'ns-ho	-nos-les 'ns-les	-nos-la 'ns-la	-nos-els 'ns-els	-nos-el 'ns-el	-nos-li 'ns-li				
li^{2}	li hi	li'n li n'	li ho	les hi	la hi	els hi	l'hi					
li^{2}	-li-hi	-li'n	-li-ho	-les-hi	-la-hi	-los-hi 'ls-hi	-l'hi					
els	els hi	els n els n'	els ho	els les	els la els l' or els la	els els	els el els l'					
els	-los-hi 'ls-hi	-los-en 'ls-en	-los-ho 'ls-ho	-los-les 'ls-les	-los-la 'ls-la	-los-els 'ls-els	-los-el 'ls-el					
el	l'hi	l'en el n'										
el	-l'hi	-l'en										
la	la hi	la en la n'										
la	-la-hi	-la'n										
les	les hi	les en les n'										
les	-les-hi	-les-en										
en	n'hi											
en	-n'hi											
^{1}la does not elide before words that begin with i-, u- (hi-, hu-)^{2}in the Valencian dialect, the combinations li les (-li-les), li la (-li-la), li'ls (-li'ls), and li'l (-li'l) may be seen

In combinations like es + en, the resulting form, pronounced [sən], could be analyzed either as s' + en or as se + 'n. The orthographic convention in such cases is to place the apostrophe as far to the right as possible: se'n, and not s'en, and similarly for se'ls, me'n, te'm, te'ns, etc. The combination of el/la with en, however, is written l'en, because there is no such pronoun as le that would justify the spelling le'n.

=== Impossible combinations ===
As mentioned above, the combinations ho + hi and ho + en are not allowed in the standard language, and must be avoided, for example by keeping only ho and leaving the other pronoun unexpressed. In some contexts, it is also acceptable to replace ho with el, giving rise to the following combinations:

- ho + hi → el + hi → l'hi

(Això, a Sabadell) l'hi portaré demà. ("I will take it there tomorrow")

- ho + en → el + en → l'en

In the second case, it is also possible to replace the pronoun en with hi:

- ho + en → el + hi → l'hi

(Això, de l'armari) l'en/l'hi trauré després. ("I will take it out of there afterwards")

This substitution of hi for en is also used to express the combination of en (ablative) + en (genitive), since the form *ne'n is not allowed:

- en + en → en + hi → n'hi

(D'homes, del teatre) n'hi sortiran tres. ("Three of them will come out of there")

=== Longer combinations ===
Sequences of three pronouns are possible, and generally consist of one of the two-pronoun combinations from the table above, preceded by em, et, ens, us, and most commonly es (the added pronoun must not already appear in the original two-pronoun cluster).

- Us posen vi als gots (They put wine in the glasses for you) → Us n'hi posen (They put some there for you)
- Se t'ofereix cervesa (You are offered beer) → Se te n'ofereix (You are offered some)

Combinations of four pronouns are very rare:

- Se'm posa pols a les sabates (Dust gets into my shoes) → Se me n'hi posa (Some of it [the sand] gets into them [the shoes])

The linguist Joan Solà presents a progression that culminates in a combination of six weak pronouns:

- Aquell amic nostre (→ te me) és capaç de posar-se a casa (→ hi) tres parents (→ ’n) del senyor Pere (→ li) (That friend of ours is able to give lodging in his house to three relatives of Senyor Pere) → Se te me li n’hi posarà tres

=== Variants ===
Combinations of weak pronouns are subject to wide regional and stylistic variation, and in several cases the normative rules presented above do not reflect actual usage.

For example, alongside the transparently derived forms of li + direct object pronoun (el, la, els, les) given in the table above, central Catalan varieties replace li with hi, while Valencian prefers to keep li:

- li + el → el + hi → l'hi (instead of li'l)
- li + la → la + hi → la hi (instead of li la)
- li + els → els + hi → els hi (instead of li'ls)
- li + les → les + hi → les hi (instead of li les)

Furthermore, the feminine forms can merge phonetically with the masculine forms in casual and careless speech; that is, in these contexts, la hi is pronounced and written as l’hi and les hi as els hi. In the same context, li ho becomes l’hi and li’n becomes n’hi:

For example: Compra tres rellotges (→ en compra) al venedor (→ li compra) → li'n va comprar tres → n'hi va comprar tres ["He/She bought him/her three."]).

In colloquial registers, the plural indirect object pronoun els is realized as els hi, and this extended form is used instead of all combinations of els followed by a 3rd person direct object pronoun:

- els + el/la/els/les/ho → els hi:

For example: → Demanen la clau (→ la demanen) als vigilants (→ els demanen) → els la demanen → els hi demanen ["They ask them for it."]).

In casual and careless speech, the plural dative els (whose singular is li, not to be confused with the plural accusative els) can be pronounced els hi:

For example: els va dir que sí → els hi va dir que sí ["He/She told them yes."]).

The elided proclitic forms ens n' and us n' are regularly replaced by the unelided forms ens en and us en before a verb starting with a vowel. For example:

- Ens en anem, instead of Ens n'anem
- Us en alegreu, instead of Us n'alegreu

In colloquial speech, the pronouns nos and vos can be shortened to s-e or s, especially when combined with en and hi, but also on their own in very informal contexts:

- Anem-nos-en → Anem's-en ("Let’s get out of here.")
- Aneu-vos-en → Aneu's-en ("You all, get out of here.")
- Aturem-nos-hi → Aturem's-hi ("Let's stop there.")
- Atureu-vos-hi → Atureu's-hi ("You all, stop there.")
- Mirem-nos → Mirem's-e ("Let’s look at each other.")
- Animeu-vos → Animeu's-e ("Cheer up!")

Many pronouns take the ellided form in colloquial speech and ordinary texts, but retain the full form in extremely careful writing. This reduction is the most natural in the Barcelona dialect, but it is not typical of formal registers:

- Digues-me → Digue'm
- Afegeix-ne → Afegeixe'n
- Permet-me → Permete'm
- Ajup-te → Ajupe't
- Mor-te → More't
- Fot-te → Fote't
- Sent-te → Sente't
- Convenç-lo → Convence'l
- Surt-me → Surte'm
- Reb-los → Rebe'ls
- Empeny-me → Empenye'm
- Conèixer-nos → Coneixe'ns
- Sigues-me → Sigue'm

== See also ==
- Pro-drop language
- Prepositional pronoun
- Clitic doubling
